

354001–354100 

|-bgcolor=#E9E9E9
| 354001 ||  || — || September 24, 2000 || Socorro || LINEAR || — || align=right | 1.1 km || 
|-id=002 bgcolor=#fefefe
| 354002 ||  || — || October 1, 2000 || Socorro || LINEAR || — || align=right data-sort-value="0.90" | 900 m || 
|-id=003 bgcolor=#fefefe
| 354003 ||  || — || October 1, 2000 || Socorro || LINEAR || — || align=right | 1.1 km || 
|-id=004 bgcolor=#fefefe
| 354004 ||  || — || November 27, 2000 || Kitt Peak || Spacewatch || NYS || align=right data-sort-value="0.76" | 760 m || 
|-id=005 bgcolor=#fefefe
| 354005 ||  || — || November 21, 2000 || Socorro || LINEAR || NYS || align=right | 1.00 km || 
|-id=006 bgcolor=#E9E9E9
| 354006 ||  || — || February 17, 2001 || Socorro || LINEAR || — || align=right | 2.8 km || 
|-id=007 bgcolor=#E9E9E9
| 354007 ||  || — || February 19, 2001 || Socorro || LINEAR || — || align=right | 1.5 km || 
|-id=008 bgcolor=#C2FFFF
| 354008 ||  || — || February 16, 2001 || Kitt Peak || Spacewatch || L4 || align=right | 9.2 km || 
|-id=009 bgcolor=#fefefe
| 354009 ||  || — || February 22, 2001 || Socorro || LINEAR || — || align=right data-sort-value="0.65" | 650 m || 
|-id=010 bgcolor=#E9E9E9
| 354010 ||  || — || March 18, 2001 || Haleakala || NEAT || — || align=right | 1.2 km || 
|-id=011 bgcolor=#E9E9E9
| 354011 ||  || — || March 19, 2001 || Socorro || LINEAR || — || align=right | 1.1 km || 
|-id=012 bgcolor=#E9E9E9
| 354012 ||  || — || March 19, 2001 || Socorro || LINEAR || — || align=right | 3.8 km || 
|-id=013 bgcolor=#E9E9E9
| 354013 ||  || — || March 29, 2001 || Kitt Peak || Spacewatch || BRG || align=right | 2.0 km || 
|-id=014 bgcolor=#E9E9E9
| 354014 ||  || — || April 26, 2001 || Socorro || LINEAR || — || align=right | 3.1 km || 
|-id=015 bgcolor=#E9E9E9
| 354015 ||  || — || June 14, 2001 || Palomar || NEAT || — || align=right | 1.6 km || 
|-id=016 bgcolor=#fefefe
| 354016 ||  || — || July 20, 2001 || Palomar || NEAT || — || align=right data-sort-value="0.89" | 890 m || 
|-id=017 bgcolor=#E9E9E9
| 354017 ||  || — || July 20, 2001 || Palomar || NEAT || — || align=right | 2.7 km || 
|-id=018 bgcolor=#fefefe
| 354018 ||  || — || July 21, 2001 || Haleakala || NEAT || — || align=right data-sort-value="0.86" | 860 m || 
|-id=019 bgcolor=#d6d6d6
| 354019 ||  || — || August 11, 2001 || Palomar || NEAT || — || align=right | 3.7 km || 
|-id=020 bgcolor=#fefefe
| 354020 ||  || — || July 25, 2001 || Haleakala || NEAT || — || align=right | 1.2 km || 
|-id=021 bgcolor=#fefefe
| 354021 ||  || — || August 22, 2001 || Socorro || LINEAR || H || align=right | 1.0 km || 
|-id=022 bgcolor=#fefefe
| 354022 ||  || — || August 22, 2001 || Socorro || LINEAR || — || align=right data-sort-value="0.98" | 980 m || 
|-id=023 bgcolor=#E9E9E9
| 354023 ||  || — || August 23, 2001 || Kitt Peak || Spacewatch || — || align=right | 2.3 km || 
|-id=024 bgcolor=#d6d6d6
| 354024 ||  || — || August 26, 2001 || Kitt Peak || Spacewatch || K-2 || align=right | 1.1 km || 
|-id=025 bgcolor=#fefefe
| 354025 ||  || — || August 24, 2001 || Socorro || LINEAR || H || align=right data-sort-value="0.83" | 830 m || 
|-id=026 bgcolor=#fefefe
| 354026 ||  || — || August 24, 2001 || Socorro || LINEAR || — || align=right | 1.1 km || 
|-id=027 bgcolor=#fefefe
| 354027 ||  || — || August 24, 2001 || Socorro || LINEAR || H || align=right data-sort-value="0.80" | 800 m || 
|-id=028 bgcolor=#E9E9E9
| 354028 ||  || — || August 20, 2001 || Socorro || LINEAR || — || align=right | 2.7 km || 
|-id=029 bgcolor=#fefefe
| 354029 ||  || — || September 10, 2001 || Eskridge || Farpoint Obs. || FLO || align=right data-sort-value="0.73" | 730 m || 
|-id=030 bgcolor=#FFC2E0
| 354030 ||  || — || September 12, 2001 || Socorro || LINEAR || AMO || align=right data-sort-value="0.69" | 690 m || 
|-id=031 bgcolor=#fefefe
| 354031 ||  || — || September 12, 2001 || Socorro || LINEAR || H || align=right data-sort-value="0.76" | 760 m || 
|-id=032 bgcolor=#fefefe
| 354032 ||  || — || September 12, 2001 || Socorro || LINEAR || — || align=right data-sort-value="0.81" | 810 m || 
|-id=033 bgcolor=#E9E9E9
| 354033 ||  || — || September 12, 2001 || Socorro || LINEAR || — || align=right | 2.6 km || 
|-id=034 bgcolor=#fefefe
| 354034 ||  || — || September 12, 2001 || Socorro || LINEAR || — || align=right data-sort-value="0.77" | 770 m || 
|-id=035 bgcolor=#fefefe
| 354035 ||  || — || September 12, 2001 || Socorro || LINEAR || — || align=right data-sort-value="0.75" | 750 m || 
|-id=036 bgcolor=#fefefe
| 354036 ||  || — || September 12, 2001 || Socorro || LINEAR || — || align=right data-sort-value="0.99" | 990 m || 
|-id=037 bgcolor=#E9E9E9
| 354037 ||  || — || September 12, 2001 || Socorro || LINEAR || PAE || align=right | 1.9 km || 
|-id=038 bgcolor=#fefefe
| 354038 ||  || — || September 12, 2001 || Socorro || LINEAR || H || align=right data-sort-value="0.66" | 660 m || 
|-id=039 bgcolor=#d6d6d6
| 354039 ||  || — || September 8, 2001 || Socorro || LINEAR || 3:2 || align=right | 5.1 km || 
|-id=040 bgcolor=#fefefe
| 354040 ||  || — || September 17, 2001 || Desert Eagle || W. K. Y. Yeung || — || align=right data-sort-value="0.91" | 910 m || 
|-id=041 bgcolor=#fefefe
| 354041 ||  || — || September 17, 2001 || Socorro || LINEAR || PHO || align=right data-sort-value="0.92" | 920 m || 
|-id=042 bgcolor=#fefefe
| 354042 ||  || — || September 16, 2001 || Socorro || LINEAR || — || align=right data-sort-value="0.87" | 870 m || 
|-id=043 bgcolor=#fefefe
| 354043 ||  || — || September 16, 2001 || Socorro || LINEAR || FLO || align=right data-sort-value="0.61" | 610 m || 
|-id=044 bgcolor=#fefefe
| 354044 ||  || — || September 20, 2001 || Socorro || LINEAR || — || align=right data-sort-value="0.76" | 760 m || 
|-id=045 bgcolor=#fefefe
| 354045 ||  || — || September 16, 2001 || Socorro || LINEAR || FLO || align=right data-sort-value="0.60" | 600 m || 
|-id=046 bgcolor=#fefefe
| 354046 ||  || — || September 17, 2001 || Socorro || LINEAR || — || align=right data-sort-value="0.88" | 880 m || 
|-id=047 bgcolor=#E9E9E9
| 354047 ||  || — || September 17, 2001 || Socorro || LINEAR || DOR || align=right | 3.2 km || 
|-id=048 bgcolor=#fefefe
| 354048 ||  || — || September 17, 2001 || Socorro || LINEAR || H || align=right data-sort-value="0.94" | 940 m || 
|-id=049 bgcolor=#fefefe
| 354049 ||  || — || September 19, 2001 || Socorro || LINEAR || — || align=right data-sort-value="0.82" | 820 m || 
|-id=050 bgcolor=#fefefe
| 354050 ||  || — || September 19, 2001 || Socorro || LINEAR || — || align=right data-sort-value="0.74" | 740 m || 
|-id=051 bgcolor=#E9E9E9
| 354051 ||  || — || September 20, 2001 || Socorro || LINEAR || EUN || align=right | 1.4 km || 
|-id=052 bgcolor=#fefefe
| 354052 ||  || — || September 21, 2001 || Socorro || LINEAR || — || align=right data-sort-value="0.89" | 890 m || 
|-id=053 bgcolor=#fefefe
| 354053 ||  || — || September 16, 2001 || Socorro || LINEAR || — || align=right | 2.6 km || 
|-id=054 bgcolor=#E9E9E9
| 354054 ||  || — || September 19, 2001 || Socorro || LINEAR || GAL || align=right | 2.0 km || 
|-id=055 bgcolor=#fefefe
| 354055 ||  || — || October 14, 2001 || Socorro || LINEAR || — || align=right data-sort-value="0.78" | 780 m || 
|-id=056 bgcolor=#fefefe
| 354056 ||  || — || October 14, 2001 || Socorro || LINEAR || H || align=right data-sort-value="0.92" | 920 m || 
|-id=057 bgcolor=#fefefe
| 354057 ||  || — || October 13, 2001 || Socorro || LINEAR || — || align=right data-sort-value="0.81" | 810 m || 
|-id=058 bgcolor=#fefefe
| 354058 ||  || — || October 13, 2001 || Socorro || LINEAR || H || align=right data-sort-value="0.83" | 830 m || 
|-id=059 bgcolor=#d6d6d6
| 354059 ||  || — || October 14, 2001 || Socorro || LINEAR || — || align=right | 3.7 km || 
|-id=060 bgcolor=#fefefe
| 354060 ||  || — || October 14, 2001 || Socorro || LINEAR || PHO || align=right data-sort-value="0.84" | 840 m || 
|-id=061 bgcolor=#d6d6d6
| 354061 ||  || — || October 14, 2001 || Socorro || LINEAR || — || align=right | 2.7 km || 
|-id=062 bgcolor=#FA8072
| 354062 ||  || — || October 14, 2001 || Socorro || LINEAR || — || align=right | 1.1 km || 
|-id=063 bgcolor=#fefefe
| 354063 ||  || — || October 15, 2001 || Socorro || LINEAR || PHO || align=right | 1.2 km || 
|-id=064 bgcolor=#fefefe
| 354064 ||  || — || October 15, 2001 || Socorro || LINEAR || — || align=right | 1.8 km || 
|-id=065 bgcolor=#d6d6d6
| 354065 ||  || — || October 12, 2001 || Haleakala || NEAT || — || align=right | 3.2 km || 
|-id=066 bgcolor=#d6d6d6
| 354066 ||  || — || October 10, 2001 || Palomar || NEAT || — || align=right | 3.2 km || 
|-id=067 bgcolor=#fefefe
| 354067 ||  || — || October 14, 2001 || Socorro || LINEAR || — || align=right data-sort-value="0.81" | 810 m || 
|-id=068 bgcolor=#fefefe
| 354068 ||  || — || October 14, 2001 || Socorro || LINEAR || — || align=right data-sort-value="0.98" | 980 m || 
|-id=069 bgcolor=#fefefe
| 354069 ||  || — || October 14, 2001 || Apache Point || SDSS || NYS || align=right data-sort-value="0.53" | 530 m || 
|-id=070 bgcolor=#fefefe
| 354070 ||  || — || October 17, 2001 || Socorro || LINEAR || V || align=right data-sort-value="0.78" | 780 m || 
|-id=071 bgcolor=#fefefe
| 354071 ||  || — || October 20, 2001 || Socorro || LINEAR || — || align=right data-sort-value="0.87" | 870 m || 
|-id=072 bgcolor=#fefefe
| 354072 ||  || — || October 17, 2001 || Socorro || LINEAR || — || align=right data-sort-value="0.92" | 920 m || 
|-id=073 bgcolor=#fefefe
| 354073 ||  || — || October 22, 2001 || Socorro || LINEAR || NYS || align=right data-sort-value="0.62" | 620 m || 
|-id=074 bgcolor=#fefefe
| 354074 ||  || — || October 19, 2001 || Socorro || LINEAR || — || align=right data-sort-value="0.94" | 940 m || 
|-id=075 bgcolor=#fefefe
| 354075 ||  || — || October 21, 2001 || Socorro || LINEAR || — || align=right data-sort-value="0.73" | 730 m || 
|-id=076 bgcolor=#fefefe
| 354076 ||  || — || October 26, 2001 || Palomar || NEAT || — || align=right | 1.1 km || 
|-id=077 bgcolor=#fefefe
| 354077 ||  || — || October 24, 2001 || Kitt Peak || Spacewatch || — || align=right data-sort-value="0.65" | 650 m || 
|-id=078 bgcolor=#fefefe
| 354078 ||  || — || October 16, 2001 || Palomar || NEAT || FLO || align=right data-sort-value="0.64" | 640 m || 
|-id=079 bgcolor=#fefefe
| 354079 ||  || — || November 9, 2001 || Socorro || LINEAR || NYS || align=right data-sort-value="0.71" | 710 m || 
|-id=080 bgcolor=#fefefe
| 354080 ||  || — || November 10, 2001 || Socorro || LINEAR || FLO || align=right data-sort-value="0.82" | 820 m || 
|-id=081 bgcolor=#fefefe
| 354081 ||  || — || November 15, 2001 || Socorro || LINEAR || PHO || align=right | 1.5 km || 
|-id=082 bgcolor=#E9E9E9
| 354082 ||  || — || November 12, 2001 || Socorro || LINEAR || — || align=right | 4.4 km || 
|-id=083 bgcolor=#d6d6d6
| 354083 ||  || — || November 23, 2001 || Uccle || T. Pauwels || — || align=right | 2.3 km || 
|-id=084 bgcolor=#fefefe
| 354084 ||  || — || November 18, 2001 || Socorro || LINEAR || — || align=right data-sort-value="0.82" | 820 m || 
|-id=085 bgcolor=#fefefe
| 354085 ||  || — || November 17, 2001 || Socorro || LINEAR || NYS || align=right data-sort-value="0.57" | 570 m || 
|-id=086 bgcolor=#fefefe
| 354086 ||  || — || November 19, 2001 || Socorro || LINEAR || NYS || align=right data-sort-value="0.60" | 600 m || 
|-id=087 bgcolor=#fefefe
| 354087 ||  || — || November 19, 2001 || Socorro || LINEAR || NYS || align=right data-sort-value="0.52" | 520 m || 
|-id=088 bgcolor=#fefefe
| 354088 ||  || — || November 20, 2001 || Socorro || LINEAR || — || align=right data-sort-value="0.75" | 750 m || 
|-id=089 bgcolor=#d6d6d6
| 354089 ||  || — || December 10, 2001 || Socorro || LINEAR || — || align=right | 3.2 km || 
|-id=090 bgcolor=#fefefe
| 354090 ||  || — || December 9, 2001 || Socorro || LINEAR || — || align=right | 1.2 km || 
|-id=091 bgcolor=#d6d6d6
| 354091 ||  || — || December 9, 2001 || Socorro || LINEAR || — || align=right | 3.9 km || 
|-id=092 bgcolor=#fefefe
| 354092 ||  || — || December 10, 2001 || Socorro || LINEAR || — || align=right data-sort-value="0.81" | 810 m || 
|-id=093 bgcolor=#fefefe
| 354093 ||  || — || December 14, 2001 || Socorro || LINEAR || NYS || align=right data-sort-value="0.64" | 640 m || 
|-id=094 bgcolor=#d6d6d6
| 354094 ||  || — || December 14, 2001 || Socorro || LINEAR || — || align=right | 3.1 km || 
|-id=095 bgcolor=#fefefe
| 354095 ||  || — || December 15, 2001 || Socorro || LINEAR || — || align=right data-sort-value="0.84" | 840 m || 
|-id=096 bgcolor=#fefefe
| 354096 ||  || — || December 15, 2001 || Socorro || LINEAR || NYS || align=right data-sort-value="0.78" | 780 m || 
|-id=097 bgcolor=#fefefe
| 354097 ||  || — || December 15, 2001 || Socorro || LINEAR || V || align=right data-sort-value="0.70" | 700 m || 
|-id=098 bgcolor=#d6d6d6
| 354098 ||  || — || December 14, 2001 || Kitt Peak || Spacewatch || — || align=right | 2.9 km || 
|-id=099 bgcolor=#d6d6d6
| 354099 ||  || — || December 14, 2001 || Kitt Peak || Spacewatch || — || align=right | 5.4 km || 
|-id=100 bgcolor=#d6d6d6
| 354100 ||  || — || December 14, 2001 || Palomar || NEAT || — || align=right | 2.4 km || 
|}

354101–354200 

|-bgcolor=#FFC2E0
| 354101 ||  || — || December 17, 2001 || Socorro || LINEAR || APO || align=right data-sort-value="0.51" | 510 m || 
|-id=102 bgcolor=#fefefe
| 354102 ||  || — || December 17, 2001 || Socorro || LINEAR || — || align=right | 1.0 km || 
|-id=103 bgcolor=#d6d6d6
| 354103 ||  || — || December 18, 2001 || Socorro || LINEAR || — || align=right | 3.2 km || 
|-id=104 bgcolor=#fefefe
| 354104 ||  || — || December 18, 2001 || Socorro || LINEAR || MAS || align=right data-sort-value="0.61" | 610 m || 
|-id=105 bgcolor=#fefefe
| 354105 ||  || — || December 18, 2001 || Socorro || LINEAR || — || align=right | 1.0 km || 
|-id=106 bgcolor=#fefefe
| 354106 ||  || — || December 18, 2001 || Socorro || LINEAR || — || align=right data-sort-value="0.99" | 990 m || 
|-id=107 bgcolor=#d6d6d6
| 354107 ||  || — || December 17, 2001 || Socorro || LINEAR || — || align=right | 3.5 km || 
|-id=108 bgcolor=#fefefe
| 354108 ||  || — || December 17, 2001 || Socorro || LINEAR || ERI || align=right | 1.7 km || 
|-id=109 bgcolor=#d6d6d6
| 354109 ||  || — || December 17, 2001 || Socorro || LINEAR || — || align=right | 3.3 km || 
|-id=110 bgcolor=#fefefe
| 354110 ||  || — || January 7, 2002 || Socorro || LINEAR || PHO || align=right | 1.3 km || 
|-id=111 bgcolor=#d6d6d6
| 354111 ||  || — || December 18, 2001 || Palomar || NEAT || — || align=right | 3.9 km || 
|-id=112 bgcolor=#FA8072
| 354112 ||  || — || January 9, 2002 || Socorro || LINEAR || PHO || align=right | 1.4 km || 
|-id=113 bgcolor=#fefefe
| 354113 ||  || — || January 13, 2002 || Socorro || LINEAR || H || align=right data-sort-value="0.99" | 990 m || 
|-id=114 bgcolor=#fefefe
| 354114 ||  || — || January 9, 2002 || Socorro || LINEAR || — || align=right | 1.1 km || 
|-id=115 bgcolor=#d6d6d6
| 354115 ||  || — || January 8, 2002 || Socorro || LINEAR || — || align=right | 3.3 km || 
|-id=116 bgcolor=#d6d6d6
| 354116 ||  || — || January 8, 2002 || Socorro || LINEAR || — || align=right | 2.5 km || 
|-id=117 bgcolor=#d6d6d6
| 354117 ||  || — || January 9, 2002 || Socorro || LINEAR || EOS || align=right | 2.6 km || 
|-id=118 bgcolor=#d6d6d6
| 354118 ||  || — || January 9, 2002 || Socorro || LINEAR || — || align=right | 3.5 km || 
|-id=119 bgcolor=#d6d6d6
| 354119 ||  || — || January 14, 2002 || Socorro || LINEAR || — || align=right | 4.1 km || 
|-id=120 bgcolor=#d6d6d6
| 354120 ||  || — || January 14, 2002 || Socorro || LINEAR || TEL || align=right | 1.7 km || 
|-id=121 bgcolor=#d6d6d6
| 354121 ||  || — || January 13, 2002 || Socorro || LINEAR || — || align=right | 4.4 km || 
|-id=122 bgcolor=#fefefe
| 354122 ||  || — || January 13, 2002 || Socorro || LINEAR || ERI || align=right | 1.6 km || 
|-id=123 bgcolor=#fefefe
| 354123 ||  || — || January 14, 2002 || Socorro || LINEAR || — || align=right data-sort-value="0.82" | 820 m || 
|-id=124 bgcolor=#fefefe
| 354124 ||  || — || January 4, 2002 || Kitt Peak || Spacewatch || NYS || align=right data-sort-value="0.84" | 840 m || 
|-id=125 bgcolor=#d6d6d6
| 354125 ||  || — || January 11, 2002 || Anderson Mesa || LONEOS || — || align=right | 4.2 km || 
|-id=126 bgcolor=#fefefe
| 354126 ||  || — || January 8, 2002 || Socorro || LINEAR || — || align=right data-sort-value="0.99" | 990 m || 
|-id=127 bgcolor=#FFC2E0
| 354127 ||  || — || January 25, 2002 || Socorro || LINEAR || AMO || align=right data-sort-value="0.54" | 540 m || 
|-id=128 bgcolor=#fefefe
| 354128 ||  || — || January 20, 2002 || Anderson Mesa || LONEOS || — || align=right data-sort-value="0.99" | 990 m || 
|-id=129 bgcolor=#d6d6d6
| 354129 ||  || — || February 3, 2002 || Palomar || NEAT || — || align=right | 4.0 km || 
|-id=130 bgcolor=#d6d6d6
| 354130 ||  || — || February 5, 2002 || Palomar || NEAT || — || align=right | 3.5 km || 
|-id=131 bgcolor=#fefefe
| 354131 ||  || — || February 6, 2002 || Socorro || LINEAR || ERI || align=right | 2.1 km || 
|-id=132 bgcolor=#d6d6d6
| 354132 ||  || — || February 6, 2002 || Socorro || LINEAR || TIR || align=right | 4.3 km || 
|-id=133 bgcolor=#d6d6d6
| 354133 ||  || — || February 3, 2002 || Haleakala || NEAT || — || align=right | 3.6 km || 
|-id=134 bgcolor=#fefefe
| 354134 ||  || — || February 7, 2002 || Socorro || LINEAR || H || align=right data-sort-value="0.87" | 870 m || 
|-id=135 bgcolor=#d6d6d6
| 354135 ||  || — || February 6, 2002 || Socorro || LINEAR || URS || align=right | 4.7 km || 
|-id=136 bgcolor=#d6d6d6
| 354136 ||  || — || February 7, 2002 || Socorro || LINEAR || — || align=right | 3.4 km || 
|-id=137 bgcolor=#d6d6d6
| 354137 ||  || — || January 14, 2002 || Socorro || LINEAR || EOS || align=right | 2.8 km || 
|-id=138 bgcolor=#fefefe
| 354138 ||  || — || February 7, 2002 || Socorro || LINEAR || — || align=right | 1.1 km || 
|-id=139 bgcolor=#fefefe
| 354139 ||  || — || February 7, 2002 || Socorro || LINEAR || — || align=right data-sort-value="0.99" | 990 m || 
|-id=140 bgcolor=#fefefe
| 354140 ||  || — || February 7, 2002 || Socorro || LINEAR || — || align=right data-sort-value="0.98" | 980 m || 
|-id=141 bgcolor=#d6d6d6
| 354141 ||  || — || February 7, 2002 || Socorro || LINEAR || — || align=right | 3.9 km || 
|-id=142 bgcolor=#fefefe
| 354142 ||  || — || February 7, 2002 || Socorro || LINEAR || NYS || align=right data-sort-value="0.63" | 630 m || 
|-id=143 bgcolor=#fefefe
| 354143 ||  || — || February 7, 2002 || Socorro || LINEAR || NYS || align=right data-sort-value="0.75" | 750 m || 
|-id=144 bgcolor=#C2FFFF
| 354144 ||  || — || February 7, 2002 || Socorro || LINEAR || L4 || align=right | 14 km || 
|-id=145 bgcolor=#d6d6d6
| 354145 ||  || — || February 7, 2002 || Socorro || LINEAR || TIR || align=right | 3.3 km || 
|-id=146 bgcolor=#fefefe
| 354146 ||  || — || February 7, 2002 || Socorro || LINEAR || — || align=right | 1.3 km || 
|-id=147 bgcolor=#d6d6d6
| 354147 ||  || — || February 7, 2002 || Bohyunsan || Bohyunsan Obs. || HYG || align=right | 2.9 km || 
|-id=148 bgcolor=#d6d6d6
| 354148 ||  || — || February 7, 2002 || Socorro || LINEAR || HYG || align=right | 3.3 km || 
|-id=149 bgcolor=#fefefe
| 354149 ||  || — || February 7, 2002 || Socorro || LINEAR || — || align=right data-sort-value="0.84" | 840 m || 
|-id=150 bgcolor=#d6d6d6
| 354150 ||  || — || February 7, 2002 || Socorro || LINEAR || TIR || align=right | 3.0 km || 
|-id=151 bgcolor=#d6d6d6
| 354151 ||  || — || February 7, 2002 || Socorro || LINEAR || TIR || align=right | 3.5 km || 
|-id=152 bgcolor=#fefefe
| 354152 ||  || — || February 8, 2002 || Socorro || LINEAR || — || align=right data-sort-value="0.87" | 870 m || 
|-id=153 bgcolor=#fefefe
| 354153 ||  || — || February 9, 2002 || Socorro || LINEAR || NYS || align=right data-sort-value="0.64" | 640 m || 
|-id=154 bgcolor=#d6d6d6
| 354154 ||  || — || February 10, 2002 || Socorro || LINEAR || EUP || align=right | 6.2 km || 
|-id=155 bgcolor=#fefefe
| 354155 ||  || — || July 30, 2000 || Cerro Tololo || M. W. Buie || — || align=right | 1.1 km || 
|-id=156 bgcolor=#d6d6d6
| 354156 ||  || — || February 10, 2002 || Socorro || LINEAR || — || align=right | 3.4 km || 
|-id=157 bgcolor=#d6d6d6
| 354157 ||  || — || February 10, 2002 || Socorro || LINEAR || THM || align=right | 2.2 km || 
|-id=158 bgcolor=#fefefe
| 354158 ||  || — || February 10, 2002 || Socorro || LINEAR || V || align=right data-sort-value="0.77" | 770 m || 
|-id=159 bgcolor=#d6d6d6
| 354159 ||  || — || January 21, 2002 || Kitt Peak || Spacewatch || THM || align=right | 2.3 km || 
|-id=160 bgcolor=#d6d6d6
| 354160 ||  || — || February 10, 2002 || Socorro || LINEAR || — || align=right | 3.9 km || 
|-id=161 bgcolor=#d6d6d6
| 354161 ||  || — || February 10, 2002 || Socorro || LINEAR || — || align=right | 2.9 km || 
|-id=162 bgcolor=#fefefe
| 354162 ||  || — || February 10, 2002 || Socorro || LINEAR || MAS || align=right data-sort-value="0.86" | 860 m || 
|-id=163 bgcolor=#fefefe
| 354163 ||  || — || February 10, 2002 || Socorro || LINEAR || H || align=right data-sort-value="0.97" | 970 m || 
|-id=164 bgcolor=#fefefe
| 354164 ||  || — || February 10, 2002 || Socorro || LINEAR || — || align=right | 1.1 km || 
|-id=165 bgcolor=#d6d6d6
| 354165 ||  || — || February 10, 2002 || Socorro || LINEAR || — || align=right | 5.0 km || 
|-id=166 bgcolor=#fefefe
| 354166 ||  || — || February 5, 2002 || Palomar || NEAT || NYS || align=right data-sort-value="0.76" | 760 m || 
|-id=167 bgcolor=#fefefe
| 354167 ||  || — || February 6, 2002 || Palomar || NEAT || — || align=right | 1.0 km || 
|-id=168 bgcolor=#fefefe
| 354168 ||  || — || February 7, 2002 || Kitt Peak || Spacewatch || — || align=right data-sort-value="0.76" | 760 m || 
|-id=169 bgcolor=#fefefe
| 354169 ||  || — || January 14, 2002 || Kitt Peak || Spacewatch || — || align=right data-sort-value="0.67" | 670 m || 
|-id=170 bgcolor=#d6d6d6
| 354170 ||  || — || February 7, 2002 || Kitt Peak || Spacewatch || — || align=right | 3.0 km || 
|-id=171 bgcolor=#d6d6d6
| 354171 ||  || — || February 9, 2002 || Palomar || NEAT || EUP || align=right | 5.4 km || 
|-id=172 bgcolor=#d6d6d6
| 354172 ||  || — || January 14, 2002 || Kitt Peak || Spacewatch || HYG || align=right | 2.8 km || 
|-id=173 bgcolor=#fefefe
| 354173 ||  || — || February 11, 2002 || Socorro || LINEAR || MAS || align=right data-sort-value="0.68" | 680 m || 
|-id=174 bgcolor=#fefefe
| 354174 ||  || — || February 11, 2002 || Socorro || LINEAR || NYS || align=right data-sort-value="0.60" | 600 m || 
|-id=175 bgcolor=#d6d6d6
| 354175 ||  || — || February 10, 2002 || Socorro || LINEAR || EOS || align=right | 2.2 km || 
|-id=176 bgcolor=#fefefe
| 354176 ||  || — || February 10, 2002 || Socorro || LINEAR || MAS || align=right | 1.00 km || 
|-id=177 bgcolor=#fefefe
| 354177 ||  || — || February 10, 2002 || Socorro || LINEAR || EUT || align=right data-sort-value="0.68" | 680 m || 
|-id=178 bgcolor=#C2FFFF
| 354178 ||  || — || February 7, 2002 || Palomar || NEAT || L4 || align=right | 9.5 km || 
|-id=179 bgcolor=#d6d6d6
| 354179 ||  || — || February 13, 2002 || Apache Point || SDSS || URS || align=right | 4.3 km || 
|-id=180 bgcolor=#C2FFFF
| 354180 ||  || — || December 2, 2010 || Mount Lemmon || Mount Lemmon Survey || L4 || align=right | 8.7 km || 
|-id=181 bgcolor=#d6d6d6
| 354181 ||  || — || February 7, 2002 || Palomar || NEAT || — || align=right | 3.9 km || 
|-id=182 bgcolor=#FFC2E0
| 354182 ||  || — || February 22, 2002 || Socorro || LINEAR || APOPHA || align=right data-sort-value="0.26" | 260 m || 
|-id=183 bgcolor=#fefefe
| 354183 ||  || — || February 17, 2002 || Palomar || NEAT || — || align=right | 1.3 km || 
|-id=184 bgcolor=#d6d6d6
| 354184 ||  || — || February 16, 2002 || Palomar || NEAT || — || align=right | 3.4 km || 
|-id=185 bgcolor=#d6d6d6
| 354185 ||  || — || March 5, 2002 || Socorro || LINEAR || EUP || align=right | 3.1 km || 
|-id=186 bgcolor=#fefefe
| 354186 ||  || — || March 3, 2002 || Haleakala || NEAT || — || align=right | 1.2 km || 
|-id=187 bgcolor=#d6d6d6
| 354187 ||  || — || March 9, 2002 || Socorro || LINEAR || — || align=right | 5.2 km || 
|-id=188 bgcolor=#d6d6d6
| 354188 ||  || — || March 9, 2002 || Palomar || NEAT || — || align=right | 3.1 km || 
|-id=189 bgcolor=#d6d6d6
| 354189 ||  || — || March 9, 2002 || Kitt Peak || Spacewatch || HYG || align=right | 3.5 km || 
|-id=190 bgcolor=#d6d6d6
| 354190 ||  || — || March 12, 2002 || Socorro || LINEAR || — || align=right | 4.3 km || 
|-id=191 bgcolor=#fefefe
| 354191 ||  || — || March 12, 2002 || Palomar || NEAT || — || align=right | 1.0 km || 
|-id=192 bgcolor=#d6d6d6
| 354192 ||  || — || March 9, 2002 || Socorro || LINEAR || — || align=right | 2.7 km || 
|-id=193 bgcolor=#d6d6d6
| 354193 ||  || — || March 13, 2002 || Socorro || LINEAR || — || align=right | 3.9 km || 
|-id=194 bgcolor=#fefefe
| 354194 ||  || — || March 13, 2002 || Socorro || LINEAR || — || align=right | 1.0 km || 
|-id=195 bgcolor=#fefefe
| 354195 ||  || — || March 13, 2002 || Socorro || LINEAR || — || align=right | 1.1 km || 
|-id=196 bgcolor=#d6d6d6
| 354196 ||  || — || March 14, 2002 || Socorro || LINEAR || MEL || align=right | 4.1 km || 
|-id=197 bgcolor=#fefefe
| 354197 ||  || — || March 11, 2002 || Kitt Peak || Spacewatch || MAS || align=right data-sort-value="0.63" | 630 m || 
|-id=198 bgcolor=#fefefe
| 354198 ||  || — || March 11, 2002 || Kitt Peak || Spacewatch || — || align=right data-sort-value="0.88" | 880 m || 
|-id=199 bgcolor=#d6d6d6
| 354199 ||  || — || March 6, 2002 || Catalina || CSS || LIX || align=right | 4.7 km || 
|-id=200 bgcolor=#fefefe
| 354200 ||  || — || March 9, 2002 || Kitt Peak || Spacewatch || — || align=right data-sort-value="0.71" | 710 m || 
|}

354201–354300 

|-bgcolor=#fefefe
| 354201 ||  || — || March 9, 2002 || Kitt Peak || Spacewatch || — || align=right data-sort-value="0.82" | 820 m || 
|-id=202 bgcolor=#C2FFFF
| 354202 ||  || — || March 10, 2002 || Cima Ekar || ADAS || L4ARK || align=right | 10 km || 
|-id=203 bgcolor=#d6d6d6
| 354203 ||  || — || March 11, 2002 || Kitt Peak || Spacewatch || EUP || align=right | 4.6 km || 
|-id=204 bgcolor=#fefefe
| 354204 ||  || — || March 12, 2002 || Palomar || NEAT || EUT || align=right data-sort-value="0.83" | 830 m || 
|-id=205 bgcolor=#d6d6d6
| 354205 ||  || — || March 11, 2002 || Kitt Peak || Spacewatch || THB || align=right | 3.1 km || 
|-id=206 bgcolor=#fefefe
| 354206 ||  || — || March 13, 2002 || Socorro || LINEAR || — || align=right | 1.0 km || 
|-id=207 bgcolor=#d6d6d6
| 354207 ||  || — || March 13, 2002 || Palomar || NEAT || — || align=right | 3.6 km || 
|-id=208 bgcolor=#d6d6d6
| 354208 ||  || — || March 18, 2002 || Desert Eagle || W. K. Y. Yeung || — || align=right | 4.3 km || 
|-id=209 bgcolor=#d6d6d6
| 354209 ||  || — || March 19, 2002 || Palomar || NEAT || Tj (2.95) || align=right | 3.8 km || 
|-id=210 bgcolor=#d6d6d6
| 354210 ||  || — || March 17, 2002 || Kitt Peak || Spacewatch || — || align=right | 3.9 km || 
|-id=211 bgcolor=#d6d6d6
| 354211 ||  || — || March 21, 2002 || Anderson Mesa || LONEOS || TIR || align=right | 4.2 km || 
|-id=212 bgcolor=#d6d6d6
| 354212 ||  || — || March 20, 2002 || Kitt Peak || M. W. Buie || THM || align=right | 2.3 km || 
|-id=213 bgcolor=#C2FFFF
| 354213 ||  || — || March 18, 2002 || Kitt Peak || Spacewatch || L4 || align=right | 9.4 km || 
|-id=214 bgcolor=#d6d6d6
| 354214 ||  || — || April 6, 2002 || Cerro Tololo || M. W. Buie || THM || align=right | 2.2 km || 
|-id=215 bgcolor=#fefefe
| 354215 ||  || — || April 4, 2002 || Palomar || NEAT || NYS || align=right data-sort-value="0.70" | 700 m || 
|-id=216 bgcolor=#fefefe
| 354216 ||  || — || April 5, 2002 || Palomar || NEAT || MAS || align=right data-sort-value="0.86" | 860 m || 
|-id=217 bgcolor=#fefefe
| 354217 ||  || — || April 8, 2002 || Palomar || NEAT || — || align=right | 1.3 km || 
|-id=218 bgcolor=#fefefe
| 354218 ||  || — || April 4, 2002 || Kitt Peak || Spacewatch || — || align=right | 1.3 km || 
|-id=219 bgcolor=#fefefe
| 354219 ||  || — || April 10, 2002 || Socorro || LINEAR || — || align=right data-sort-value="0.99" | 990 m || 
|-id=220 bgcolor=#fefefe
| 354220 ||  || — || April 10, 2002 || Socorro || LINEAR || NYS || align=right data-sort-value="0.92" | 920 m || 
|-id=221 bgcolor=#fefefe
| 354221 ||  || — || April 15, 2002 || Palomar || NEAT || NYS || align=right data-sort-value="0.85" | 850 m || 
|-id=222 bgcolor=#fefefe
| 354222 ||  || — || April 4, 2002 || Palomar || NEAT || — || align=right | 1.1 km || 
|-id=223 bgcolor=#d6d6d6
| 354223 ||  || — || April 11, 2002 || Palomar || NEAT || TIR || align=right | 3.0 km || 
|-id=224 bgcolor=#fefefe
| 354224 ||  || — || April 2, 2002 || Palomar || NEAT || NYS || align=right data-sort-value="0.76" | 760 m || 
|-id=225 bgcolor=#d6d6d6
| 354225 ||  || — || April 16, 2002 || Socorro || LINEAR || Tj (2.96) || align=right | 5.7 km || 
|-id=226 bgcolor=#fefefe
| 354226 ||  || — || May 7, 2002 || Kitt Peak || Spacewatch || — || align=right data-sort-value="0.77" | 770 m || 
|-id=227 bgcolor=#d6d6d6
| 354227 ||  || — || May 5, 2002 || Palomar || NEAT || — || align=right | 4.3 km || 
|-id=228 bgcolor=#d6d6d6
| 354228 ||  || — || May 10, 2002 || Palomar || NEAT || — || align=right | 3.3 km || 
|-id=229 bgcolor=#fefefe
| 354229 ||  || — || May 19, 2002 || Haleakala || NEAT || — || align=right | 1.3 km || 
|-id=230 bgcolor=#d6d6d6
| 354230 ||  || — || June 1, 2002 || Socorro || LINEAR || Tj (2.9) || align=right | 4.0 km || 
|-id=231 bgcolor=#E9E9E9
| 354231 ||  || — || June 20, 2002 || Palomar || NEAT || — || align=right | 1.4 km || 
|-id=232 bgcolor=#E9E9E9
| 354232 ||  || — || July 12, 2002 || Palomar || NEAT || EUN || align=right | 1.3 km || 
|-id=233 bgcolor=#E9E9E9
| 354233 ||  || — || July 14, 2002 || Palomar || NEAT || — || align=right | 2.6 km || 
|-id=234 bgcolor=#E9E9E9
| 354234 ||  || — || July 13, 2002 || Haleakala || NEAT || RAF || align=right | 1.2 km || 
|-id=235 bgcolor=#E9E9E9
| 354235 ||  || — || August 8, 2002 || Anderson Mesa || LONEOS || HNS || align=right | 1.4 km || 
|-id=236 bgcolor=#E9E9E9
| 354236 ||  || — || August 5, 2002 || Palomar || NEAT || — || align=right | 1.5 km || 
|-id=237 bgcolor=#E9E9E9
| 354237 ||  || — || July 17, 2002 || Haleakala || NEAT || — || align=right | 1.7 km || 
|-id=238 bgcolor=#E9E9E9
| 354238 ||  || — || July 4, 2002 || Palomar || NEAT || — || align=right | 1.0 km || 
|-id=239 bgcolor=#E9E9E9
| 354239 ||  || — || July 22, 2002 || Palomar || NEAT || KON || align=right | 2.4 km || 
|-id=240 bgcolor=#E9E9E9
| 354240 ||  || — || August 4, 2002 || Socorro || LINEAR || — || align=right | 2.3 km || 
|-id=241 bgcolor=#E9E9E9
| 354241 ||  || — || August 4, 2002 || Palomar || NEAT || MAR || align=right | 1.2 km || 
|-id=242 bgcolor=#E9E9E9
| 354242 ||  || — || August 4, 2002 || Palomar || NEAT || — || align=right | 2.7 km || 
|-id=243 bgcolor=#E9E9E9
| 354243 ||  || — || August 6, 2002 || Palomar || NEAT || — || align=right | 1.4 km || 
|-id=244 bgcolor=#E9E9E9
| 354244 ||  || — || August 6, 2002 || Campo Imperatore || CINEOS || — || align=right | 1.6 km || 
|-id=245 bgcolor=#E9E9E9
| 354245 ||  || — || August 11, 2002 || Palomar || NEAT || — || align=right | 1.3 km || 
|-id=246 bgcolor=#E9E9E9
| 354246 ||  || — || August 13, 2002 || Palomar || NEAT || — || align=right | 1.1 km || 
|-id=247 bgcolor=#E9E9E9
| 354247 ||  || — || August 14, 2002 || Socorro || LINEAR || — || align=right | 1.4 km || 
|-id=248 bgcolor=#E9E9E9
| 354248 ||  || — || August 12, 2002 || Socorro || LINEAR || KON || align=right | 2.9 km || 
|-id=249 bgcolor=#E9E9E9
| 354249 ||  || — || August 12, 2002 || Socorro || LINEAR || ADE || align=right | 2.3 km || 
|-id=250 bgcolor=#E9E9E9
| 354250 ||  || — || July 14, 2002 || Palomar || NEAT || MAR || align=right | 1.3 km || 
|-id=251 bgcolor=#E9E9E9
| 354251 ||  || — || August 11, 2002 || Palomar || NEAT || — || align=right | 1.7 km || 
|-id=252 bgcolor=#E9E9E9
| 354252 ||  || — || October 23, 2011 || Andrushivka || Y. Ivaščenko, P. Kyrylenko || — || align=right | 1.5 km || 
|-id=253 bgcolor=#E9E9E9
| 354253 ||  || — || August 26, 2002 || Palomar || NEAT || EUN || align=right | 1.3 km || 
|-id=254 bgcolor=#E9E9E9
| 354254 ||  || — || August 18, 2002 || Palomar || NEAT || — || align=right | 1.1 km || 
|-id=255 bgcolor=#E9E9E9
| 354255 ||  || — || August 27, 2002 || Palomar || NEAT || EUN || align=right | 1.5 km || 
|-id=256 bgcolor=#E9E9E9
| 354256 ||  || — || August 28, 2002 || Palomar || NEAT || EUN || align=right | 1.1 km || 
|-id=257 bgcolor=#E9E9E9
| 354257 ||  || — || August 28, 2002 || Palomar || NEAT || — || align=right | 2.5 km || 
|-id=258 bgcolor=#E9E9E9
| 354258 ||  || — || August 16, 2002 || Palomar || NEAT || — || align=right | 1.0 km || 
|-id=259 bgcolor=#E9E9E9
| 354259 ||  || — || August 17, 2002 || Palomar || NEAT || — || align=right | 1.0 km || 
|-id=260 bgcolor=#E9E9E9
| 354260 ||  || — || August 27, 2002 || Palomar || NEAT || — || align=right | 1.3 km || 
|-id=261 bgcolor=#E9E9E9
| 354261 ||  || — || November 8, 2002 || Apache Point || SDSS || — || align=right | 1.6 km || 
|-id=262 bgcolor=#E9E9E9
| 354262 ||  || — || November 1, 2008 || Mount Lemmon || Mount Lemmon Survey || HNS || align=right | 1.4 km || 
|-id=263 bgcolor=#E9E9E9
| 354263 ||  || — || August 20, 2002 || Palomar || NEAT || — || align=right | 1.9 km || 
|-id=264 bgcolor=#E9E9E9
| 354264 ||  || — || August 19, 2002 || Palomar || NEAT || — || align=right | 2.0 km || 
|-id=265 bgcolor=#E9E9E9
| 354265 ||  || — || June 22, 2006 || Palomar || NEAT || — || align=right | 1.3 km || 
|-id=266 bgcolor=#E9E9E9
| 354266 ||  || — || May 23, 2006 || Mount Lemmon || Mount Lemmon Survey || — || align=right | 1.4 km || 
|-id=267 bgcolor=#E9E9E9
| 354267 ||  || — || February 2, 2005 || Kitt Peak || Spacewatch || — || align=right | 1.3 km || 
|-id=268 bgcolor=#E9E9E9
| 354268 ||  || — || October 14, 2007 || Mount Lemmon || Mount Lemmon Survey || — || align=right | 1.5 km || 
|-id=269 bgcolor=#E9E9E9
| 354269 ||  || — || September 4, 2002 || Anderson Mesa || LONEOS || — || align=right | 2.0 km || 
|-id=270 bgcolor=#E9E9E9
| 354270 ||  || — || September 5, 2002 || Socorro || LINEAR || — || align=right | 2.6 km || 
|-id=271 bgcolor=#E9E9E9
| 354271 ||  || — || September 6, 2002 || Socorro || LINEAR || — || align=right | 2.4 km || 
|-id=272 bgcolor=#E9E9E9
| 354272 ||  || — || August 11, 2002 || Haleakala || NEAT || — || align=right | 2.5 km || 
|-id=273 bgcolor=#E9E9E9
| 354273 ||  || — || September 14, 2002 || Kitt Peak || Spacewatch || WIT || align=right data-sort-value="0.90" | 900 m || 
|-id=274 bgcolor=#E9E9E9
| 354274 ||  || — || September 12, 2002 || Palomar || NEAT || EUN || align=right | 1.3 km || 
|-id=275 bgcolor=#fefefe
| 354275 ||  || — || September 14, 2002 || Palomar || NEAT || — || align=right data-sort-value="0.60" | 600 m || 
|-id=276 bgcolor=#E9E9E9
| 354276 ||  || — || September 13, 2002 || Socorro || LINEAR || — || align=right | 1.3 km || 
|-id=277 bgcolor=#d6d6d6
| 354277 ||  || — || September 13, 2002 || Haleakala || NEAT || — || align=right | 5.5 km || 
|-id=278 bgcolor=#E9E9E9
| 354278 ||  || — || September 15, 2002 || Palomar || R. Matson || — || align=right | 2.2 km || 
|-id=279 bgcolor=#E9E9E9
| 354279 ||  || — || August 17, 2002 || Palomar || S. F. Hönig || HNS || align=right | 1.4 km || 
|-id=280 bgcolor=#E9E9E9
| 354280 ||  || — || September 14, 2002 || Palomar || R. Matson || — || align=right | 1.3 km || 
|-id=281 bgcolor=#E9E9E9
| 354281 ||  || — || September 15, 2002 || Palomar || NEAT || — || align=right | 2.1 km || 
|-id=282 bgcolor=#E9E9E9
| 354282 ||  || — || September 14, 2002 || Palomar || NEAT || — || align=right | 1.6 km || 
|-id=283 bgcolor=#E9E9E9
| 354283 ||  || — || September 12, 2002 || Palomar || NEAT || — || align=right | 1.1 km || 
|-id=284 bgcolor=#E9E9E9
| 354284 ||  || — || September 3, 2002 || Palomar || NEAT || — || align=right | 1.6 km || 
|-id=285 bgcolor=#E9E9E9
| 354285 ||  || — || September 13, 2002 || Palomar || NEAT || — || align=right | 2.2 km || 
|-id=286 bgcolor=#E9E9E9
| 354286 ||  || — || September 4, 2002 || Palomar || NEAT || RAF || align=right | 1.2 km || 
|-id=287 bgcolor=#E9E9E9
| 354287 ||  || — || September 4, 2002 || Palomar || NEAT || — || align=right | 1.2 km || 
|-id=288 bgcolor=#E9E9E9
| 354288 ||  || — || September 4, 2002 || Palomar || NEAT || — || align=right | 1.2 km || 
|-id=289 bgcolor=#E9E9E9
| 354289 ||  || — || November 13, 2007 || Mount Lemmon || Mount Lemmon Survey || — || align=right | 1.8 km || 
|-id=290 bgcolor=#E9E9E9
| 354290 ||  || — || August 19, 2002 || Palomar || NEAT || — || align=right | 1.8 km || 
|-id=291 bgcolor=#E9E9E9
| 354291 ||  || — || February 24, 2009 || Catalina || CSS || — || align=right | 1.3 km || 
|-id=292 bgcolor=#E9E9E9
| 354292 ||  || — || September 27, 2002 || Palomar || NEAT || MAR || align=right | 1.6 km || 
|-id=293 bgcolor=#E9E9E9
| 354293 ||  || — || September 17, 2002 || Palomar || NEAT || — || align=right | 1.4 km || 
|-id=294 bgcolor=#E9E9E9
| 354294 ||  || — || October 5, 2002 || Socorro || LINEAR || — || align=right | 2.6 km || 
|-id=295 bgcolor=#E9E9E9
| 354295 ||  || — || October 3, 2002 || Palomar || NEAT || — || align=right | 3.4 km || 
|-id=296 bgcolor=#E9E9E9
| 354296 ||  || — || October 3, 2002 || Palomar || NEAT || CLO || align=right | 2.8 km || 
|-id=297 bgcolor=#E9E9E9
| 354297 ||  || — || October 1, 2002 || Socorro || LINEAR || — || align=right | 3.7 km || 
|-id=298 bgcolor=#E9E9E9
| 354298 ||  || — || October 2, 2002 || Campo Imperatore || CINEOS || — || align=right | 2.9 km || 
|-id=299 bgcolor=#E9E9E9
| 354299 ||  || — || October 3, 2002 || Palomar || NEAT || GEF || align=right | 1.5 km || 
|-id=300 bgcolor=#E9E9E9
| 354300 ||  || — || October 4, 2002 || Palomar || NEAT || — || align=right | 3.2 km || 
|}

354301–354400 

|-bgcolor=#E9E9E9
| 354301 ||  || — || October 5, 2002 || Palomar || NEAT || — || align=right | 2.3 km || 
|-id=302 bgcolor=#E9E9E9
| 354302 ||  || — || October 4, 2002 || Palomar || NEAT || BAR || align=right | 1.4 km || 
|-id=303 bgcolor=#E9E9E9
| 354303 ||  || — || October 12, 2002 || Socorro || LINEAR || — || align=right | 2.6 km || 
|-id=304 bgcolor=#E9E9E9
| 354304 ||  || — || October 7, 2002 || Anderson Mesa || LONEOS || — || align=right | 1.6 km || 
|-id=305 bgcolor=#E9E9E9
| 354305 ||  || — || October 6, 2002 || Socorro || LINEAR || — || align=right | 3.0 km || 
|-id=306 bgcolor=#E9E9E9
| 354306 ||  || — || October 9, 2002 || Kitt Peak || Spacewatch || — || align=right | 2.3 km || 
|-id=307 bgcolor=#E9E9E9
| 354307 ||  || — || October 5, 2002 || Socorro || LINEAR || — || align=right | 2.8 km || 
|-id=308 bgcolor=#E9E9E9
| 354308 ||  || — || October 4, 2002 || Apache Point || SDSS || ADE || align=right | 2.7 km || 
|-id=309 bgcolor=#E9E9E9
| 354309 ||  || — || October 4, 2002 || Apache Point || SDSS || — || align=right | 2.5 km || 
|-id=310 bgcolor=#E9E9E9
| 354310 ||  || — || October 10, 2002 || Palomar || NEAT || CLO || align=right | 2.5 km || 
|-id=311 bgcolor=#E9E9E9
| 354311 ||  || — || October 15, 2002 || Palomar || NEAT || — || align=right | 2.1 km || 
|-id=312 bgcolor=#E9E9E9
| 354312 ||  || — || October 28, 2002 || Nogales || C. W. Juels, P. R. Holvorcem || PAD || align=right | 2.2 km || 
|-id=313 bgcolor=#E9E9E9
| 354313 ||  || — || October 31, 2002 || Kitt Peak || Spacewatch || — || align=right | 3.5 km || 
|-id=314 bgcolor=#E9E9E9
| 354314 ||  || — || October 31, 2002 || Anderson Mesa || LONEOS || — || align=right | 2.3 km || 
|-id=315 bgcolor=#E9E9E9
| 354315 ||  || — || October 29, 2002 || Apache Point || SDSS || MAR || align=right | 3.5 km || 
|-id=316 bgcolor=#E9E9E9
| 354316 ||  || — || October 31, 2002 || Palomar || NEAT || — || align=right | 2.2 km || 
|-id=317 bgcolor=#d6d6d6
| 354317 ||  || — || November 5, 2002 || Socorro || LINEAR || — || align=right | 2.8 km || 
|-id=318 bgcolor=#E9E9E9
| 354318 ||  || — || November 7, 2002 || Socorro || LINEAR || DOR || align=right | 3.2 km || 
|-id=319 bgcolor=#E9E9E9
| 354319 ||  || — || November 13, 2002 || Palomar || NEAT || DOR || align=right | 3.1 km || 
|-id=320 bgcolor=#E9E9E9
| 354320 ||  || — || November 13, 2002 || Palomar || NEAT || — || align=right | 2.3 km || 
|-id=321 bgcolor=#E9E9E9
| 354321 ||  || — || September 26, 2006 || Catalina || CSS || — || align=right | 3.1 km || 
|-id=322 bgcolor=#E9E9E9
| 354322 ||  || — || November 5, 2002 || Palomar || NEAT || — || align=right | 2.0 km || 
|-id=323 bgcolor=#E9E9E9
| 354323 ||  || — || August 28, 2006 || Anderson Mesa || LONEOS || AST || align=right | 2.2 km || 
|-id=324 bgcolor=#E9E9E9
| 354324 ||  || — || October 3, 1997 || Kitt Peak || Spacewatch || — || align=right | 3.2 km || 
|-id=325 bgcolor=#E9E9E9
| 354325 ||  || — || November 23, 2002 || Palomar || NEAT || — || align=right | 2.2 km || 
|-id=326 bgcolor=#E9E9E9
| 354326 ||  || — || November 24, 2002 || Palomar || NEAT || — || align=right | 3.3 km || 
|-id=327 bgcolor=#E9E9E9
| 354327 ||  || — || November 24, 2002 || Palomar || NEAT || AGN || align=right | 1.3 km || 
|-id=328 bgcolor=#E9E9E9
| 354328 ||  || — || May 6, 2009 || Siding Spring || SSS || — || align=right | 4.4 km || 
|-id=329 bgcolor=#E9E9E9
| 354329 ||  || — || December 3, 2002 || Palomar || NEAT || — || align=right | 2.8 km || 
|-id=330 bgcolor=#E9E9E9
| 354330 ||  || — || December 31, 2002 || Socorro || LINEAR || — || align=right | 3.0 km || 
|-id=331 bgcolor=#fefefe
| 354331 ||  || — || December 31, 2002 || Socorro || LINEAR || — || align=right data-sort-value="0.84" | 840 m || 
|-id=332 bgcolor=#FFC2E0
| 354332 ||  || — || January 2, 2003 || Socorro || LINEAR || AMO +1km || align=right data-sort-value="0.85" | 850 m || 
|-id=333 bgcolor=#d6d6d6
| 354333 ||  || — || January 1, 2003 || Needville || Needville Obs. || 628 || align=right | 1.7 km || 
|-id=334 bgcolor=#d6d6d6
| 354334 ||  || — || January 10, 2003 || Socorro || LINEAR || — || align=right | 2.6 km || 
|-id=335 bgcolor=#fefefe
| 354335 ||  || — || January 25, 2003 || Anderson Mesa || LONEOS || — || align=right data-sort-value="0.97" | 970 m || 
|-id=336 bgcolor=#d6d6d6
| 354336 ||  || — || January 30, 2003 || Kitt Peak || Spacewatch || — || align=right | 2.7 km || 
|-id=337 bgcolor=#d6d6d6
| 354337 ||  || — || February 22, 2003 || Palomar || NEAT || — || align=right | 2.4 km || 
|-id=338 bgcolor=#fefefe
| 354338 ||  || — || March 6, 2003 || Socorro || LINEAR || H || align=right data-sort-value="0.75" | 750 m || 
|-id=339 bgcolor=#fefefe
| 354339 ||  || — || March 8, 2003 || Kitt Peak || Spacewatch || — || align=right data-sort-value="0.55" | 550 m || 
|-id=340 bgcolor=#fefefe
| 354340 ||  || — || March 29, 2003 || Piszkéstető || K. Sárneczky || PHO || align=right data-sort-value="0.97" | 970 m || 
|-id=341 bgcolor=#d6d6d6
| 354341 ||  || — || March 27, 2003 || Socorro || LINEAR || — || align=right | 4.7 km || 
|-id=342 bgcolor=#C2FFFF
| 354342 ||  || — || March 28, 2003 || Kitt Peak || Spacewatch || L4 || align=right | 13 km || 
|-id=343 bgcolor=#fefefe
| 354343 ||  || — || March 29, 2003 || Anderson Mesa || LONEOS || — || align=right | 1.3 km || 
|-id=344 bgcolor=#fefefe
| 354344 ||  || — || March 30, 2003 || Kitt Peak || Spacewatch || FLO || align=right data-sort-value="0.63" | 630 m || 
|-id=345 bgcolor=#fefefe
| 354345 ||  || — || March 31, 2003 || Anderson Mesa || LONEOS || — || align=right data-sort-value="0.79" | 790 m || 
|-id=346 bgcolor=#fefefe
| 354346 ||  || — || March 24, 2003 || Kitt Peak || Spacewatch || FLO || align=right data-sort-value="0.66" | 660 m || 
|-id=347 bgcolor=#d6d6d6
| 354347 ||  || — || March 31, 2003 || Anderson Mesa || LONEOS || — || align=right | 3.2 km || 
|-id=348 bgcolor=#d6d6d6
| 354348 ||  || — || March 24, 2003 || Kitt Peak || Spacewatch || — || align=right | 2.5 km || 
|-id=349 bgcolor=#fefefe
| 354349 ||  || — || March 27, 2003 || Kitt Peak || Spacewatch || NYS || align=right data-sort-value="0.64" | 640 m || 
|-id=350 bgcolor=#fefefe
| 354350 ||  || — || April 1, 2003 || Socorro || LINEAR || H || align=right data-sort-value="0.82" | 820 m || 
|-id=351 bgcolor=#C2FFFF
| 354351 ||  || — || April 7, 2003 || Kitt Peak || Spacewatch || L4ARK || align=right | 12 km || 
|-id=352 bgcolor=#fefefe
| 354352 ||  || — || April 7, 2003 || Uccle || T. Pauwels || — || align=right data-sort-value="0.87" | 870 m || 
|-id=353 bgcolor=#d6d6d6
| 354353 ||  || — || April 9, 2003 || Socorro || LINEAR || EOS || align=right | 2.1 km || 
|-id=354 bgcolor=#C2FFFF
| 354354 ||  || — || April 4, 2003 || Kitt Peak || Spacewatch || L4 || align=right | 13 km || 
|-id=355 bgcolor=#d6d6d6
| 354355 ||  || — || April 3, 2003 || Anderson Mesa || LONEOS || — || align=right | 3.4 km || 
|-id=356 bgcolor=#fefefe
| 354356 ||  || — || April 24, 2003 || Kitt Peak || Spacewatch || — || align=right data-sort-value="0.77" | 770 m || 
|-id=357 bgcolor=#d6d6d6
| 354357 ||  || — || April 24, 2003 || Kitt Peak || Spacewatch || — || align=right | 3.9 km || 
|-id=358 bgcolor=#fefefe
| 354358 ||  || — || April 24, 2003 || Socorro || LINEAR || PHO || align=right | 2.2 km || 
|-id=359 bgcolor=#d6d6d6
| 354359 ||  || — || April 29, 2003 || Kitt Peak || Spacewatch || — || align=right | 4.0 km || 
|-id=360 bgcolor=#fefefe
| 354360 ||  || — || April 28, 2003 || Socorro || LINEAR || — || align=right | 1.2 km || 
|-id=361 bgcolor=#fefefe
| 354361 ||  || — || April 26, 2003 || Apache Point || SDSS || PHO || align=right data-sort-value="0.82" | 820 m || 
|-id=362 bgcolor=#d6d6d6
| 354362 ||  || — || May 22, 2003 || Kitt Peak || Spacewatch || — || align=right | 3.3 km || 
|-id=363 bgcolor=#d6d6d6
| 354363 ||  || — || April 25, 2003 || Kitt Peak || Spacewatch || — || align=right | 4.4 km || 
|-id=364 bgcolor=#C2FFFF
| 354364 ||  || — || May 31, 2003 || Cerro Tololo || M. W. Buie || L4 || align=right | 7.0 km || 
|-id=365 bgcolor=#FA8072
| 354365 ||  || — || June 4, 2003 || Socorro || LINEAR || — || align=right data-sort-value="0.96" | 960 m || 
|-id=366 bgcolor=#fefefe
| 354366 ||  || — || July 22, 2003 || Haleakala || NEAT || — || align=right | 1.1 km || 
|-id=367 bgcolor=#fefefe
| 354367 ||  || — || July 25, 2003 || Socorro || LINEAR || H || align=right data-sort-value="0.98" | 980 m || 
|-id=368 bgcolor=#FA8072
| 354368 ||  || — || August 19, 2003 || Campo Imperatore || CINEOS || — || align=right data-sort-value="0.67" | 670 m || 
|-id=369 bgcolor=#fefefe
| 354369 ||  || — || August 22, 2003 || Haleakala || NEAT || NYS || align=right data-sort-value="0.89" | 890 m || 
|-id=370 bgcolor=#E9E9E9
| 354370 ||  || — || August 22, 2003 || Palomar || NEAT || — || align=right | 1.1 km || 
|-id=371 bgcolor=#fefefe
| 354371 ||  || — || August 22, 2003 || Haleakala || NEAT || — || align=right | 1.4 km || 
|-id=372 bgcolor=#E9E9E9
| 354372 ||  || — || July 24, 2003 || Palomar || NEAT || — || align=right data-sort-value="0.98" | 980 m || 
|-id=373 bgcolor=#fefefe
| 354373 ||  || — || September 1, 2003 || Socorro || LINEAR || H || align=right data-sort-value="0.79" | 790 m || 
|-id=374 bgcolor=#FA8072
| 354374 ||  || — || September 7, 2003 || Socorro || LINEAR || — || align=right | 1.6 km || 
|-id=375 bgcolor=#E9E9E9
| 354375 ||  || — || September 16, 2003 || Palomar || NEAT || — || align=right | 1.6 km || 
|-id=376 bgcolor=#fefefe
| 354376 ||  || — || September 17, 2003 || Kitt Peak || Spacewatch || NYS || align=right | 1.8 km || 
|-id=377 bgcolor=#fefefe
| 354377 ||  || — || September 18, 2003 || Palomar || NEAT || H || align=right data-sort-value="0.82" | 820 m || 
|-id=378 bgcolor=#E9E9E9
| 354378 ||  || — || September 16, 2003 || Palomar || NEAT || — || align=right | 1.1 km || 
|-id=379 bgcolor=#fefefe
| 354379 ||  || — || September 18, 2003 || Kitt Peak || Spacewatch || V || align=right data-sort-value="0.80" | 800 m || 
|-id=380 bgcolor=#E9E9E9
| 354380 ||  || — || September 16, 2003 || Anderson Mesa || LONEOS || — || align=right | 1.4 km || 
|-id=381 bgcolor=#E9E9E9
| 354381 ||  || — || September 17, 2003 || Socorro || LINEAR || — || align=right | 1.0 km || 
|-id=382 bgcolor=#E9E9E9
| 354382 ||  || — || September 18, 2003 || Palomar || NEAT || — || align=right data-sort-value="0.96" | 960 m || 
|-id=383 bgcolor=#E9E9E9
| 354383 ||  || — || September 16, 2003 || Kitt Peak || Spacewatch || — || align=right | 1.2 km || 
|-id=384 bgcolor=#E9E9E9
| 354384 ||  || — || September 23, 2003 || Palomar || NEAT || — || align=right | 1.5 km || 
|-id=385 bgcolor=#fefefe
| 354385 ||  || — || September 21, 2003 || Kitt Peak || Spacewatch || H || align=right data-sort-value="0.88" | 880 m || 
|-id=386 bgcolor=#E9E9E9
| 354386 ||  || — || September 25, 2003 || Palomar || NEAT || — || align=right data-sort-value="0.98" | 980 m || 
|-id=387 bgcolor=#E9E9E9
| 354387 ||  || — || September 27, 2003 || Kitt Peak || Spacewatch || — || align=right data-sort-value="0.80" | 800 m || 
|-id=388 bgcolor=#fefefe
| 354388 ||  || — || September 29, 2003 || Kitt Peak || Spacewatch || — || align=right | 1.0 km || 
|-id=389 bgcolor=#fefefe
| 354389 ||  || — || September 17, 2003 || Palomar || NEAT || — || align=right | 1.2 km || 
|-id=390 bgcolor=#fefefe
| 354390 ||  || — || September 17, 2003 || Palomar || NEAT || H || align=right data-sort-value="0.87" | 870 m || 
|-id=391 bgcolor=#fefefe
| 354391 ||  || — || September 16, 2003 || Kitt Peak || Spacewatch || V || align=right data-sort-value="0.85" | 850 m || 
|-id=392 bgcolor=#fefefe
| 354392 ||  || — || September 18, 2003 || Kitt Peak || Spacewatch || NYS || align=right data-sort-value="0.76" | 760 m || 
|-id=393 bgcolor=#fefefe
| 354393 ||  || — || September 20, 2003 || Kitt Peak || Spacewatch || V || align=right data-sort-value="0.82" | 820 m || 
|-id=394 bgcolor=#E9E9E9
| 354394 ||  || — || September 28, 2003 || Apache Point || SDSS || — || align=right data-sort-value="0.96" | 960 m || 
|-id=395 bgcolor=#fefefe
| 354395 ||  || — || September 26, 2003 || Apache Point || SDSS || MAS || align=right data-sort-value="0.85" | 850 m || 
|-id=396 bgcolor=#E9E9E9
| 354396 ||  || — || October 1, 2003 || Kitt Peak || Spacewatch || — || align=right | 1.2 km || 
|-id=397 bgcolor=#E9E9E9
| 354397 ||  || — || October 5, 2003 || Socorro || LINEAR || — || align=right | 1.1 km || 
|-id=398 bgcolor=#E9E9E9
| 354398 ||  || — || October 18, 2003 || Kitt Peak || Spacewatch || — || align=right | 1.9 km || 
|-id=399 bgcolor=#fefefe
| 354399 ||  || — || October 16, 2003 || Kitt Peak || Spacewatch || NYS || align=right data-sort-value="0.76" | 760 m || 
|-id=400 bgcolor=#E9E9E9
| 354400 ||  || — || October 16, 2003 || Palomar || NEAT || — || align=right | 1.3 km || 
|}

354401–354500 

|-bgcolor=#E9E9E9
| 354401 ||  || — || October 17, 2003 || Kitt Peak || Spacewatch || — || align=right | 1.1 km || 
|-id=402 bgcolor=#E9E9E9
| 354402 ||  || — || October 19, 2003 || Kitt Peak || Spacewatch || — || align=right | 1.0 km || 
|-id=403 bgcolor=#E9E9E9
| 354403 ||  || — || October 20, 2003 || Socorro || LINEAR || — || align=right | 1.3 km || 
|-id=404 bgcolor=#E9E9E9
| 354404 ||  || — || October 20, 2003 || Kitt Peak || Spacewatch || — || align=right | 1.5 km || 
|-id=405 bgcolor=#E9E9E9
| 354405 ||  || — || October 22, 2003 || Kitt Peak || Spacewatch || — || align=right data-sort-value="0.99" | 990 m || 
|-id=406 bgcolor=#E9E9E9
| 354406 ||  || — || October 21, 2003 || Socorro || LINEAR || — || align=right | 1.0 km || 
|-id=407 bgcolor=#E9E9E9
| 354407 ||  || — || October 21, 2003 || Kitt Peak || Spacewatch || — || align=right | 1.1 km || 
|-id=408 bgcolor=#FA8072
| 354408 ||  || — || October 22, 2003 || Socorro || LINEAR || — || align=right | 2.0 km || 
|-id=409 bgcolor=#fefefe
| 354409 ||  || — || October 24, 2003 || Socorro || LINEAR || — || align=right | 1.1 km || 
|-id=410 bgcolor=#E9E9E9
| 354410 ||  || — || October 24, 2003 || Socorro || LINEAR || — || align=right | 1.4 km || 
|-id=411 bgcolor=#E9E9E9
| 354411 ||  || — || October 29, 2003 || Socorro || LINEAR || — || align=right | 1.6 km || 
|-id=412 bgcolor=#E9E9E9
| 354412 ||  || — || October 18, 2003 || Apache Point || SDSS || — || align=right data-sort-value="0.63" | 630 m || 
|-id=413 bgcolor=#E9E9E9
| 354413 ||  || — || October 18, 2003 || Kitt Peak || Spacewatch || — || align=right | 1.0 km || 
|-id=414 bgcolor=#E9E9E9
| 354414 || 2003 VA || — || November 1, 2003 || Emerald Lane || L. Ball || — || align=right | 1.2 km || 
|-id=415 bgcolor=#E9E9E9
| 354415 ||  || — || November 3, 2003 || Socorro || LINEAR || — || align=right | 1.4 km || 
|-id=416 bgcolor=#E9E9E9
| 354416 ||  || — || November 16, 2003 || Catalina || CSS || — || align=right | 1.4 km || 
|-id=417 bgcolor=#E9E9E9
| 354417 ||  || — || November 18, 2003 || Kitt Peak || Spacewatch || BRG || align=right | 1.7 km || 
|-id=418 bgcolor=#fefefe
| 354418 ||  || — || November 18, 2003 || Kitt Peak || Spacewatch || — || align=right | 1.1 km || 
|-id=419 bgcolor=#E9E9E9
| 354419 ||  || — || November 18, 2003 || Palomar || NEAT || — || align=right | 2.0 km || 
|-id=420 bgcolor=#E9E9E9
| 354420 ||  || — || November 18, 2003 || Kitt Peak || Spacewatch || — || align=right | 1.1 km || 
|-id=421 bgcolor=#E9E9E9
| 354421 ||  || — || November 20, 2003 || Socorro || LINEAR || — || align=right | 1.3 km || 
|-id=422 bgcolor=#E9E9E9
| 354422 ||  || — || November 20, 2003 || Socorro || LINEAR || — || align=right | 1.3 km || 
|-id=423 bgcolor=#E9E9E9
| 354423 ||  || — || November 20, 2003 || Palomar || NEAT || — || align=right | 1.3 km || 
|-id=424 bgcolor=#fefefe
| 354424 ||  || — || November 19, 2003 || Anderson Mesa || LONEOS || NYS || align=right | 1.00 km || 
|-id=425 bgcolor=#E9E9E9
| 354425 ||  || — || November 21, 2003 || Kitt Peak || Spacewatch || — || align=right | 1.2 km || 
|-id=426 bgcolor=#E9E9E9
| 354426 ||  || — || November 19, 2003 || Socorro || LINEAR || IAN || align=right | 1.1 km || 
|-id=427 bgcolor=#E9E9E9
| 354427 ||  || — || November 20, 2003 || Socorro || LINEAR || — || align=right | 1.3 km || 
|-id=428 bgcolor=#E9E9E9
| 354428 ||  || — || November 21, 2003 || Socorro || LINEAR || — || align=right | 1.8 km || 
|-id=429 bgcolor=#E9E9E9
| 354429 ||  || — || November 21, 2003 || Socorro || LINEAR || — || align=right | 2.2 km || 
|-id=430 bgcolor=#E9E9E9
| 354430 ||  || — || November 21, 2003 || Socorro || LINEAR || — || align=right | 1.6 km || 
|-id=431 bgcolor=#E9E9E9
| 354431 ||  || — || November 18, 2003 || Palomar || NEAT || BRG || align=right | 1.4 km || 
|-id=432 bgcolor=#E9E9E9
| 354432 ||  || — || November 19, 2003 || Anderson Mesa || LONEOS || — || align=right | 1.4 km || 
|-id=433 bgcolor=#E9E9E9
| 354433 ||  || — || December 14, 2003 || Palomar || NEAT || JUN || align=right | 1.1 km || 
|-id=434 bgcolor=#E9E9E9
| 354434 ||  || — || December 17, 2003 || Socorro || LINEAR || — || align=right | 1.7 km || 
|-id=435 bgcolor=#E9E9E9
| 354435 ||  || — || December 17, 2003 || Socorro || LINEAR || JUN || align=right | 4.0 km || 
|-id=436 bgcolor=#E9E9E9
| 354436 ||  || — || December 17, 2003 || Kitt Peak || Spacewatch || — || align=right | 2.9 km || 
|-id=437 bgcolor=#E9E9E9
| 354437 ||  || — || December 15, 1998 || Caussols || ODAS || — || align=right | 2.6 km || 
|-id=438 bgcolor=#E9E9E9
| 354438 ||  || — || December 19, 2003 || Socorro || LINEAR || GER || align=right | 1.9 km || 
|-id=439 bgcolor=#E9E9E9
| 354439 ||  || — || December 19, 2003 || Socorro || LINEAR || — || align=right | 1.5 km || 
|-id=440 bgcolor=#E9E9E9
| 354440 ||  || — || December 19, 2003 || Socorro || LINEAR || JUN || align=right | 1.6 km || 
|-id=441 bgcolor=#E9E9E9
| 354441 ||  || — || December 22, 2003 || Socorro || LINEAR || — || align=right | 2.3 km || 
|-id=442 bgcolor=#E9E9E9
| 354442 ||  || — || December 22, 2003 || Socorro || LINEAR || — || align=right | 1.4 km || 
|-id=443 bgcolor=#E9E9E9
| 354443 ||  || — || December 23, 2003 || Socorro || LINEAR || — || align=right | 2.0 km || 
|-id=444 bgcolor=#E9E9E9
| 354444 ||  || — || December 25, 2003 || Haleakala || NEAT || — || align=right | 2.0 km || 
|-id=445 bgcolor=#E9E9E9
| 354445 ||  || — || December 27, 2003 || Socorro || LINEAR || JUN || align=right | 1.5 km || 
|-id=446 bgcolor=#E9E9E9
| 354446 ||  || — || December 28, 2003 || Socorro || LINEAR || CLO || align=right | 2.4 km || 
|-id=447 bgcolor=#E9E9E9
| 354447 ||  || — || December 28, 2003 || Socorro || LINEAR || — || align=right | 2.2 km || 
|-id=448 bgcolor=#E9E9E9
| 354448 ||  || — || December 18, 2003 || Socorro || LINEAR || EUN || align=right | 1.6 km || 
|-id=449 bgcolor=#E9E9E9
| 354449 ||  || — || January 15, 2004 || Kitt Peak || Spacewatch || — || align=right | 1.2 km || 
|-id=450 bgcolor=#E9E9E9
| 354450 ||  || — || January 16, 2004 || Kitt Peak || Spacewatch || — || align=right | 1.5 km || 
|-id=451 bgcolor=#E9E9E9
| 354451 ||  || — || January 16, 2004 || Palomar || NEAT || EUN || align=right | 1.5 km || 
|-id=452 bgcolor=#E9E9E9
| 354452 ||  || — || January 17, 2004 || Palomar || NEAT || — || align=right | 2.4 km || 
|-id=453 bgcolor=#E9E9E9
| 354453 ||  || — || January 16, 2004 || Palomar || NEAT || JUN || align=right | 1.5 km || 
|-id=454 bgcolor=#E9E9E9
| 354454 ||  || — || January 17, 2004 || Palomar || NEAT || — || align=right | 1.6 km || 
|-id=455 bgcolor=#E9E9E9
| 354455 ||  || — || December 21, 2003 || Kitt Peak || Spacewatch || — || align=right | 1.9 km || 
|-id=456 bgcolor=#E9E9E9
| 354456 ||  || — || January 18, 2004 || Palomar || NEAT || — || align=right | 3.0 km || 
|-id=457 bgcolor=#E9E9E9
| 354457 ||  || — || January 19, 2004 || Kitt Peak || Spacewatch || — || align=right | 2.1 km || 
|-id=458 bgcolor=#E9E9E9
| 354458 ||  || — || January 22, 2004 || Socorro || LINEAR || MAR || align=right | 1.3 km || 
|-id=459 bgcolor=#E9E9E9
| 354459 ||  || — || January 24, 2004 || Socorro || LINEAR || — || align=right | 1.7 km || 
|-id=460 bgcolor=#E9E9E9
| 354460 ||  || — || December 27, 2003 || Socorro || LINEAR || ADE || align=right | 2.6 km || 
|-id=461 bgcolor=#E9E9E9
| 354461 ||  || — || January 23, 2004 || Socorro || LINEAR || — || align=right | 4.1 km || 
|-id=462 bgcolor=#E9E9E9
| 354462 ||  || — || January 28, 2004 || Socorro || LINEAR || — || align=right | 2.8 km || 
|-id=463 bgcolor=#E9E9E9
| 354463 ||  || — || January 28, 2004 || Catalina || CSS || HNS || align=right | 1.6 km || 
|-id=464 bgcolor=#E9E9E9
| 354464 ||  || — || January 19, 2004 || Kitt Peak || Spacewatch || — || align=right | 1.6 km || 
|-id=465 bgcolor=#E9E9E9
| 354465 ||  || — || December 29, 2003 || Kitt Peak || Spacewatch || — || align=right | 1.8 km || 
|-id=466 bgcolor=#E9E9E9
| 354466 ||  || — || January 28, 2004 || Kitt Peak || Spacewatch || — || align=right | 1.7 km || 
|-id=467 bgcolor=#E9E9E9
| 354467 ||  || — || February 11, 2004 || Kitt Peak || Spacewatch || JUN || align=right | 1.2 km || 
|-id=468 bgcolor=#E9E9E9
| 354468 ||  || — || February 13, 2004 || Palomar || NEAT || 526 || align=right | 3.2 km || 
|-id=469 bgcolor=#E9E9E9
| 354469 ||  || — || February 9, 2004 || Palomar || NEAT || — || align=right | 2.3 km || 
|-id=470 bgcolor=#E9E9E9
| 354470 ||  || — || January 17, 2004 || Palomar || NEAT || — || align=right | 2.9 km || 
|-id=471 bgcolor=#E9E9E9
| 354471 ||  || — || January 17, 2004 || Haleakala || NEAT || — || align=right | 1.8 km || 
|-id=472 bgcolor=#E9E9E9
| 354472 ||  || — || January 22, 2004 || Socorro || LINEAR || GEF || align=right | 1.4 km || 
|-id=473 bgcolor=#E9E9E9
| 354473 ||  || — || February 11, 2004 || Palomar || NEAT || — || align=right | 3.0 km || 
|-id=474 bgcolor=#E9E9E9
| 354474 ||  || — || February 12, 2004 || Palomar || NEAT || — || align=right | 3.1 km || 
|-id=475 bgcolor=#E9E9E9
| 354475 ||  || — || February 12, 2004 || Palomar || NEAT || — || align=right | 3.6 km || 
|-id=476 bgcolor=#E9E9E9
| 354476 ||  || — || February 14, 2004 || Kitt Peak || Spacewatch || — || align=right | 3.4 km || 
|-id=477 bgcolor=#E9E9E9
| 354477 ||  || — || February 16, 2004 || Catalina || CSS || — || align=right | 3.7 km || 
|-id=478 bgcolor=#E9E9E9
| 354478 ||  || — || February 18, 2004 || Socorro || LINEAR || — || align=right | 2.1 km || 
|-id=479 bgcolor=#E9E9E9
| 354479 ||  || — || January 27, 2004 || Catalina || CSS || — || align=right | 2.9 km || 
|-id=480 bgcolor=#E9E9E9
| 354480 ||  || — || March 11, 2004 || Palomar || NEAT || — || align=right | 4.3 km || 
|-id=481 bgcolor=#E9E9E9
| 354481 ||  || — || March 11, 2004 || Palomar || NEAT || — || align=right | 2.9 km || 
|-id=482 bgcolor=#E9E9E9
| 354482 ||  || — || March 12, 2004 || Palomar || NEAT || — || align=right | 2.9 km || 
|-id=483 bgcolor=#E9E9E9
| 354483 ||  || — || March 12, 2004 || Palomar || NEAT || — || align=right | 2.0 km || 
|-id=484 bgcolor=#d6d6d6
| 354484 ||  || — || March 15, 2004 || Kitt Peak || Spacewatch || KOR || align=right | 1.4 km || 
|-id=485 bgcolor=#E9E9E9
| 354485 ||  || — || March 15, 2004 || Palomar || NEAT || — || align=right | 2.5 km || 
|-id=486 bgcolor=#E9E9E9
| 354486 ||  || — || March 14, 2004 || Kitt Peak || Spacewatch || — || align=right | 2.8 km || 
|-id=487 bgcolor=#E9E9E9
| 354487 ||  || — || March 15, 2004 || Socorro || LINEAR || POS || align=right | 3.8 km || 
|-id=488 bgcolor=#E9E9E9
| 354488 ||  || — || March 15, 2004 || Socorro || LINEAR || — || align=right | 3.1 km || 
|-id=489 bgcolor=#E9E9E9
| 354489 ||  || — || March 16, 2004 || Catalina || CSS || — || align=right | 2.9 km || 
|-id=490 bgcolor=#E9E9E9
| 354490 ||  || — || March 30, 2004 || Socorro || LINEAR || — || align=right | 2.4 km || 
|-id=491 bgcolor=#E9E9E9
| 354491 ||  || — || March 18, 2004 || Socorro || LINEAR || JUN || align=right | 1.3 km || 
|-id=492 bgcolor=#E9E9E9
| 354492 ||  || — || March 23, 2004 || Socorro || LINEAR || MRX || align=right | 1.1 km || 
|-id=493 bgcolor=#E9E9E9
| 354493 ||  || — || March 26, 2004 || Catalina || CSS || — || align=right | 3.9 km || 
|-id=494 bgcolor=#E9E9E9
| 354494 ||  || — || March 18, 2004 || Palomar || NEAT || — || align=right | 3.4 km || 
|-id=495 bgcolor=#E9E9E9
| 354495 ||  || — || April 11, 2004 || Palomar || NEAT || — || align=right | 2.4 km || 
|-id=496 bgcolor=#d6d6d6
| 354496 ||  || — || May 13, 2004 || Kitt Peak || Spacewatch || EOS || align=right | 2.3 km || 
|-id=497 bgcolor=#d6d6d6
| 354497 ||  || — || May 9, 2004 || Kitt Peak || Spacewatch || — || align=right | 4.4 km || 
|-id=498 bgcolor=#E9E9E9
| 354498 ||  || — || May 17, 2004 || Socorro || LINEAR || — || align=right | 2.5 km || 
|-id=499 bgcolor=#fefefe
| 354499 ||  || — || July 14, 2004 || Socorro || LINEAR || — || align=right data-sort-value="0.86" | 860 m || 
|-id=500 bgcolor=#d6d6d6
| 354500 ||  || — || July 16, 2004 || Cerro Tololo || Cerro Tololo Obs. || — || align=right | 3.5 km || 
|}

354501–354600 

|-bgcolor=#d6d6d6
| 354501 ||  || — || August 6, 2004 || Palomar || NEAT || — || align=right | 5.0 km || 
|-id=502 bgcolor=#fefefe
| 354502 ||  || — || August 7, 2004 || Palomar || NEAT || NYS || align=right data-sort-value="0.61" | 610 m || 
|-id=503 bgcolor=#FA8072
| 354503 ||  || — || August 7, 2004 || Palomar || NEAT || — || align=right | 1.1 km || 
|-id=504 bgcolor=#fefefe
| 354504 ||  || — || August 6, 2004 || Palomar || NEAT || — || align=right | 1.0 km || 
|-id=505 bgcolor=#fefefe
| 354505 ||  || — || July 15, 2004 || Socorro || LINEAR || FLO || align=right data-sort-value="0.91" | 910 m || 
|-id=506 bgcolor=#fefefe
| 354506 ||  || — || August 7, 2004 || Siding Spring || SSS || — || align=right data-sort-value="0.76" | 760 m || 
|-id=507 bgcolor=#fefefe
| 354507 ||  || — || August 8, 2004 || Socorro || LINEAR || NYS || align=right data-sort-value="0.75" | 750 m || 
|-id=508 bgcolor=#d6d6d6
| 354508 ||  || — || August 9, 2004 || Socorro || LINEAR || — || align=right | 3.7 km || 
|-id=509 bgcolor=#fefefe
| 354509 ||  || — || August 9, 2004 || Socorro || LINEAR || — || align=right | 1.2 km || 
|-id=510 bgcolor=#d6d6d6
| 354510 ||  || — || August 11, 2004 || Palomar || NEAT || EUP || align=right | 8.0 km || 
|-id=511 bgcolor=#fefefe
| 354511 ||  || — || August 8, 2004 || Socorro || LINEAR || — || align=right data-sort-value="0.76" | 760 m || 
|-id=512 bgcolor=#d6d6d6
| 354512 ||  || — || August 16, 2004 || Siding Spring || SSS || — || align=right | 6.0 km || 
|-id=513 bgcolor=#fefefe
| 354513 ||  || — || August 24, 2004 || Socorro || LINEAR || PHO || align=right | 3.6 km || 
|-id=514 bgcolor=#fefefe
| 354514 ||  || — || September 4, 2004 || Palomar || NEAT || — || align=right data-sort-value="0.97" | 970 m || 
|-id=515 bgcolor=#fefefe
| 354515 ||  || — || September 6, 2004 || Saint-Véran || Saint-Véran Obs. || NYS || align=right data-sort-value="0.69" | 690 m || 
|-id=516 bgcolor=#d6d6d6
| 354516 ||  || — || September 8, 2004 || Socorro || LINEAR || — || align=right | 2.9 km || 
|-id=517 bgcolor=#d6d6d6
| 354517 ||  || — || September 8, 2004 || Socorro || LINEAR || — || align=right | 4.0 km || 
|-id=518 bgcolor=#fefefe
| 354518 ||  || — || September 8, 2004 || Socorro || LINEAR || — || align=right data-sort-value="0.90" | 900 m || 
|-id=519 bgcolor=#fefefe
| 354519 ||  || — || September 8, 2004 || Socorro || LINEAR || MAS || align=right data-sort-value="0.75" | 750 m || 
|-id=520 bgcolor=#fefefe
| 354520 ||  || — || September 8, 2004 || Socorro || LINEAR || NYS || align=right data-sort-value="0.76" | 760 m || 
|-id=521 bgcolor=#fefefe
| 354521 ||  || — || September 8, 2004 || Socorro || LINEAR || FLO || align=right data-sort-value="0.85" | 850 m || 
|-id=522 bgcolor=#fefefe
| 354522 ||  || — || September 8, 2004 || Socorro || LINEAR || FLO || align=right data-sort-value="0.96" | 960 m || 
|-id=523 bgcolor=#fefefe
| 354523 ||  || — || September 7, 2004 || Socorro || LINEAR || — || align=right data-sort-value="0.78" | 780 m || 
|-id=524 bgcolor=#fefefe
| 354524 ||  || — || August 25, 2004 || Kitt Peak || Spacewatch || V || align=right data-sort-value="0.68" | 680 m || 
|-id=525 bgcolor=#FA8072
| 354525 ||  || — || September 8, 2004 || Socorro || LINEAR || — || align=right data-sort-value="0.81" | 810 m || 
|-id=526 bgcolor=#fefefe
| 354526 ||  || — || August 11, 2004 || Socorro || LINEAR || — || align=right data-sort-value="0.85" | 850 m || 
|-id=527 bgcolor=#d6d6d6
| 354527 ||  || — || September 10, 2004 || Socorro || LINEAR || — || align=right | 4.1 km || 
|-id=528 bgcolor=#d6d6d6
| 354528 ||  || — || September 10, 2004 || Socorro || LINEAR || — || align=right | 5.6 km || 
|-id=529 bgcolor=#d6d6d6
| 354529 ||  || — || September 10, 2004 || Socorro || LINEAR || — || align=right | 4.3 km || 
|-id=530 bgcolor=#fefefe
| 354530 ||  || — || September 10, 2004 || Socorro || LINEAR || — || align=right | 1.1 km || 
|-id=531 bgcolor=#fefefe
| 354531 ||  || — || September 10, 2004 || Socorro || LINEAR || V || align=right data-sort-value="0.73" | 730 m || 
|-id=532 bgcolor=#fefefe
| 354532 ||  || — || September 10, 2004 || Socorro || LINEAR || — || align=right data-sort-value="0.86" | 860 m || 
|-id=533 bgcolor=#fefefe
| 354533 ||  || — || September 10, 2004 || Socorro || LINEAR || FLO || align=right data-sort-value="0.66" | 660 m || 
|-id=534 bgcolor=#fefefe
| 354534 ||  || — || September 10, 2004 || Socorro || LINEAR || — || align=right | 1.1 km || 
|-id=535 bgcolor=#d6d6d6
| 354535 ||  || — || September 11, 2004 || Socorro || LINEAR || — || align=right | 5.3 km || 
|-id=536 bgcolor=#fefefe
| 354536 ||  || — || September 11, 2004 || Socorro || LINEAR || — || align=right | 2.3 km || 
|-id=537 bgcolor=#fefefe
| 354537 ||  || — || September 8, 2004 || Socorro || LINEAR || V || align=right data-sort-value="0.62" | 620 m || 
|-id=538 bgcolor=#fefefe
| 354538 ||  || — || September 9, 2004 || Kitt Peak || Spacewatch || NYS || align=right data-sort-value="0.73" | 730 m || 
|-id=539 bgcolor=#fefefe
| 354539 ||  || — || September 10, 2004 || Kitt Peak || Spacewatch || — || align=right data-sort-value="0.66" | 660 m || 
|-id=540 bgcolor=#fefefe
| 354540 ||  || — || September 13, 2004 || Socorro || LINEAR || NYS || align=right data-sort-value="0.66" | 660 m || 
|-id=541 bgcolor=#FA8072
| 354541 ||  || — || September 14, 2004 || Siding Spring || SSS || H || align=right data-sort-value="0.75" | 750 m || 
|-id=542 bgcolor=#fefefe
| 354542 ||  || — || September 9, 2004 || Socorro || LINEAR || FLO || align=right data-sort-value="0.63" | 630 m || 
|-id=543 bgcolor=#d6d6d6
| 354543 ||  || — || September 10, 2004 || Kitt Peak || Spacewatch || THM || align=right | 2.2 km || 
|-id=544 bgcolor=#d6d6d6
| 354544 ||  || — || September 11, 2004 || Kitt Peak || Spacewatch || — || align=right | 4.2 km || 
|-id=545 bgcolor=#fefefe
| 354545 ||  || — || September 14, 2004 || Anderson Mesa || LONEOS || V || align=right data-sort-value="0.88" | 880 m || 
|-id=546 bgcolor=#d6d6d6
| 354546 ||  || — || September 17, 2004 || Kitt Peak || Spacewatch || — || align=right | 4.0 km || 
|-id=547 bgcolor=#fefefe
| 354547 ||  || — || September 17, 2004 || Socorro || LINEAR || NYS || align=right data-sort-value="0.83" | 830 m || 
|-id=548 bgcolor=#fefefe
| 354548 ||  || — || September 18, 2004 || Socorro || LINEAR || ERI || align=right | 1.6 km || 
|-id=549 bgcolor=#fefefe
| 354549 ||  || — || September 22, 2004 || Socorro || LINEAR || — || align=right data-sort-value="0.81" | 810 m || 
|-id=550 bgcolor=#fefefe
| 354550 ||  || — || September 22, 2004 || Socorro || LINEAR || — || align=right | 1.1 km || 
|-id=551 bgcolor=#fefefe
| 354551 ||  || — || October 8, 2004 || Goodricke-Pigott || R. A. Tucker || NYS || align=right data-sort-value="0.87" | 870 m || 
|-id=552 bgcolor=#fefefe
| 354552 ||  || — || October 11, 2004 || Yamagata || Yamagata Obs. || MAS || align=right data-sort-value="0.77" | 770 m || 
|-id=553 bgcolor=#fefefe
| 354553 ||  || — || October 4, 2004 || Kitt Peak || Spacewatch || — || align=right data-sort-value="0.83" | 830 m || 
|-id=554 bgcolor=#fefefe
| 354554 ||  || — || October 4, 2004 || Kitt Peak || Spacewatch || — || align=right data-sort-value="0.90" | 900 m || 
|-id=555 bgcolor=#fefefe
| 354555 ||  || — || October 4, 2004 || Kitt Peak || Spacewatch || NYS || align=right data-sort-value="0.85" | 850 m || 
|-id=556 bgcolor=#fefefe
| 354556 ||  || — || October 4, 2004 || Kitt Peak || Spacewatch || NYS || align=right data-sort-value="0.56" | 560 m || 
|-id=557 bgcolor=#fefefe
| 354557 ||  || — || October 5, 2004 || Kitt Peak || Spacewatch || MAS || align=right data-sort-value="0.76" | 760 m || 
|-id=558 bgcolor=#FA8072
| 354558 ||  || — || October 6, 2004 || Anderson Mesa || LONEOS || — || align=right data-sort-value="0.86" | 860 m || 
|-id=559 bgcolor=#fefefe
| 354559 ||  || — || October 6, 2004 || Kitt Peak || Spacewatch || — || align=right | 1.0 km || 
|-id=560 bgcolor=#fefefe
| 354560 ||  || — || October 6, 2004 || Kitt Peak || Spacewatch || — || align=right data-sort-value="0.82" | 820 m || 
|-id=561 bgcolor=#fefefe
| 354561 ||  || — || October 6, 2004 || Palomar || NEAT || — || align=right | 1.0 km || 
|-id=562 bgcolor=#fefefe
| 354562 ||  || — || October 5, 2004 || Kitt Peak || Spacewatch || NYS || align=right data-sort-value="0.63" | 630 m || 
|-id=563 bgcolor=#fefefe
| 354563 ||  || — || October 5, 2004 || Kitt Peak || Spacewatch || NYS || align=right data-sort-value="0.68" | 680 m || 
|-id=564 bgcolor=#fefefe
| 354564 ||  || — || October 5, 2004 || Kitt Peak || Spacewatch || V || align=right data-sort-value="0.82" | 820 m || 
|-id=565 bgcolor=#fefefe
| 354565 ||  || — || October 5, 2004 || Kitt Peak || Spacewatch || V || align=right data-sort-value="0.67" | 670 m || 
|-id=566 bgcolor=#fefefe
| 354566 ||  || — || October 7, 2004 || Socorro || LINEAR || MAS || align=right data-sort-value="0.94" | 940 m || 
|-id=567 bgcolor=#fefefe
| 354567 ||  || — || October 7, 2004 || Socorro || LINEAR || — || align=right | 1.0 km || 
|-id=568 bgcolor=#fefefe
| 354568 ||  || — || October 7, 2004 || Anderson Mesa || LONEOS || MAS || align=right data-sort-value="0.84" | 840 m || 
|-id=569 bgcolor=#fefefe
| 354569 ||  || — || October 7, 2004 || Palomar || NEAT || — || align=right | 3.0 km || 
|-id=570 bgcolor=#fefefe
| 354570 ||  || — || September 7, 2004 || Kitt Peak || Spacewatch || — || align=right data-sort-value="0.82" | 820 m || 
|-id=571 bgcolor=#fefefe
| 354571 ||  || — || October 6, 2004 || Kitt Peak || Spacewatch || — || align=right | 1.1 km || 
|-id=572 bgcolor=#d6d6d6
| 354572 ||  || — || October 7, 2004 || Kitt Peak || Spacewatch || — || align=right | 3.4 km || 
|-id=573 bgcolor=#fefefe
| 354573 ||  || — || October 7, 2004 || Kitt Peak || Spacewatch || — || align=right data-sort-value="0.86" | 860 m || 
|-id=574 bgcolor=#fefefe
| 354574 ||  || — || October 9, 2004 || Kitt Peak || Spacewatch || — || align=right data-sort-value="0.68" | 680 m || 
|-id=575 bgcolor=#fefefe
| 354575 ||  || — || October 10, 2004 || Palomar || NEAT || MAS || align=right data-sort-value="0.78" | 780 m || 
|-id=576 bgcolor=#fefefe
| 354576 ||  || — || October 13, 2004 || Kitt Peak || Spacewatch || NYS || align=right data-sort-value="0.79" | 790 m || 
|-id=577 bgcolor=#fefefe
| 354577 ||  || — || October 10, 2004 || Kitt Peak || M. W. Buie || NYS || align=right data-sort-value="0.67" | 670 m || 
|-id=578 bgcolor=#fefefe
| 354578 ||  || — || October 9, 2004 || Socorro || LINEAR || FLO || align=right data-sort-value="0.80" | 800 m || 
|-id=579 bgcolor=#fefefe
| 354579 ||  || — || November 3, 2004 || Kitt Peak || Spacewatch || NYS || align=right data-sort-value="0.79" | 790 m || 
|-id=580 bgcolor=#E9E9E9
| 354580 ||  || — || November 3, 2004 || Catalina || CSS || — || align=right | 1.3 km || 
|-id=581 bgcolor=#fefefe
| 354581 ||  || — || November 4, 2004 || Kitt Peak || Spacewatch || NYS || align=right data-sort-value="0.76" | 760 m || 
|-id=582 bgcolor=#fefefe
| 354582 ||  || — || November 4, 2004 || Catalina || CSS || NYS || align=right data-sort-value="0.75" | 750 m || 
|-id=583 bgcolor=#fefefe
| 354583 ||  || — || November 3, 2004 || Kitt Peak || Spacewatch || FLO || align=right data-sort-value="0.79" | 790 m || 
|-id=584 bgcolor=#fefefe
| 354584 ||  || — || November 4, 2004 || Catalina || CSS || — || align=right | 1.0 km || 
|-id=585 bgcolor=#E9E9E9
| 354585 ||  || — || November 9, 2004 || Catalina || CSS || MAR || align=right | 1.3 km || 
|-id=586 bgcolor=#fefefe
| 354586 ||  || — || November 19, 2004 || Socorro || LINEAR || ERI || align=right | 2.3 km || 
|-id=587 bgcolor=#fefefe
| 354587 ||  || — || December 8, 2004 || Socorro || LINEAR || — || align=right | 1.0 km || 
|-id=588 bgcolor=#fefefe
| 354588 ||  || — || December 8, 2004 || Socorro || LINEAR || MAS || align=right data-sort-value="0.93" | 930 m || 
|-id=589 bgcolor=#fefefe
| 354589 ||  || — || December 9, 2004 || Kitt Peak || Spacewatch || NYS || align=right data-sort-value="0.90" | 900 m || 
|-id=590 bgcolor=#E9E9E9
| 354590 ||  || — || December 10, 2004 || Socorro || LINEAR || — || align=right | 1.0 km || 
|-id=591 bgcolor=#fefefe
| 354591 ||  || — || December 10, 2004 || Socorro || LINEAR || — || align=right | 1.2 km || 
|-id=592 bgcolor=#E9E9E9
| 354592 ||  || — || December 10, 2004 || Kitt Peak || Spacewatch || ADE || align=right | 3.5 km || 
|-id=593 bgcolor=#fefefe
| 354593 ||  || — || December 10, 2004 || Socorro || LINEAR || MAS || align=right data-sort-value="0.90" | 900 m || 
|-id=594 bgcolor=#fefefe
| 354594 ||  || — || December 18, 2004 || Mount Lemmon || Mount Lemmon Survey || MAS || align=right data-sort-value="0.86" | 860 m || 
|-id=595 bgcolor=#fefefe
| 354595 ||  || — || December 18, 2004 || Mount Lemmon || Mount Lemmon Survey || NYS || align=right data-sort-value="0.74" | 740 m || 
|-id=596 bgcolor=#fefefe
| 354596 ||  || — || December 16, 2004 || Kitt Peak || Spacewatch || — || align=right data-sort-value="0.88" | 880 m || 
|-id=597 bgcolor=#fefefe
| 354597 ||  || — || December 21, 2004 || Catalina || CSS || H || align=right data-sort-value="0.95" | 950 m || 
|-id=598 bgcolor=#E9E9E9
| 354598 ||  || — || January 6, 2005 || Socorro || LINEAR || EUN || align=right | 1.8 km || 
|-id=599 bgcolor=#E9E9E9
| 354599 ||  || — || January 7, 2005 || Socorro || LINEAR || — || align=right | 1.4 km || 
|-id=600 bgcolor=#fefefe
| 354600 ||  || — || January 13, 2005 || Catalina || CSS || — || align=right | 1.3 km || 
|}

354601–354700 

|-bgcolor=#fefefe
| 354601 ||  || — || January 15, 2005 || Kitt Peak || Spacewatch || — || align=right data-sort-value="0.99" | 990 m || 
|-id=602 bgcolor=#fefefe
| 354602 ||  || — || January 15, 2005 || Catalina || CSS || H || align=right data-sort-value="0.91" | 910 m || 
|-id=603 bgcolor=#fefefe
| 354603 ||  || — || January 17, 2005 || Socorro || LINEAR || NYS || align=right data-sort-value="0.76" | 760 m || 
|-id=604 bgcolor=#fefefe
| 354604 ||  || — || February 1, 2005 || Catalina || CSS || — || align=right data-sort-value="0.91" | 910 m || 
|-id=605 bgcolor=#E9E9E9
| 354605 ||  || — || February 4, 2005 || Catalina || CSS || — || align=right | 2.2 km || 
|-id=606 bgcolor=#fefefe
| 354606 ||  || — || February 1, 2005 || Goodricke-Pigott || R. A. Tucker || H || align=right data-sort-value="0.87" | 870 m || 
|-id=607 bgcolor=#E9E9E9
| 354607 ||  || — || February 9, 2005 || La Silla || A. Boattini, H. Scholl || — || align=right data-sort-value="0.88" | 880 m || 
|-id=608 bgcolor=#E9E9E9
| 354608 ||  || — || February 1, 2005 || Kitt Peak || Spacewatch || — || align=right | 2.4 km || 
|-id=609 bgcolor=#fefefe
| 354609 ||  || — || March 3, 2005 || Catalina || CSS || H || align=right | 1.3 km || 
|-id=610 bgcolor=#fefefe
| 354610 ||  || — || March 4, 2005 || Socorro || LINEAR || H || align=right data-sort-value="0.89" | 890 m || 
|-id=611 bgcolor=#E9E9E9
| 354611 ||  || — || March 3, 2005 || Kitt Peak || Spacewatch || RAF || align=right | 1.1 km || 
|-id=612 bgcolor=#E9E9E9
| 354612 ||  || — || March 3, 2005 || Catalina || CSS || — || align=right | 1.1 km || 
|-id=613 bgcolor=#E9E9E9
| 354613 ||  || — || March 7, 2005 || Socorro || LINEAR || — || align=right | 1.7 km || 
|-id=614 bgcolor=#fefefe
| 354614 ||  || — || March 3, 2005 || Catalina || CSS || H || align=right data-sort-value="0.75" | 750 m || 
|-id=615 bgcolor=#E9E9E9
| 354615 ||  || — || March 8, 2005 || Socorro || LINEAR || — || align=right | 1.4 km || 
|-id=616 bgcolor=#E9E9E9
| 354616 ||  || — || March 8, 2005 || Mount Lemmon || Mount Lemmon Survey || — || align=right | 1.1 km || 
|-id=617 bgcolor=#E9E9E9
| 354617 ||  || — || March 4, 2005 || Mount Lemmon || Mount Lemmon Survey || — || align=right data-sort-value="0.96" | 960 m || 
|-id=618 bgcolor=#E9E9E9
| 354618 ||  || — || March 8, 2005 || Mount Lemmon || Mount Lemmon Survey || MIS || align=right | 1.9 km || 
|-id=619 bgcolor=#fefefe
| 354619 ||  || — || March 9, 2005 || Kitt Peak || Spacewatch || — || align=right data-sort-value="0.86" | 860 m || 
|-id=620 bgcolor=#E9E9E9
| 354620 ||  || — || March 10, 2005 || Mount Lemmon || Mount Lemmon Survey || — || align=right data-sort-value="0.71" | 710 m || 
|-id=621 bgcolor=#E9E9E9
| 354621 ||  || — || March 10, 2005 || Mount Lemmon || Mount Lemmon Survey || — || align=right data-sort-value="0.76" | 760 m || 
|-id=622 bgcolor=#E9E9E9
| 354622 ||  || — || March 9, 2005 || Mount Lemmon || Mount Lemmon Survey || — || align=right | 1.3 km || 
|-id=623 bgcolor=#E9E9E9
| 354623 ||  || — || March 8, 2005 || Kitt Peak || Spacewatch || — || align=right | 1.0 km || 
|-id=624 bgcolor=#E9E9E9
| 354624 ||  || — || March 9, 2005 || Anderson Mesa || LONEOS || — || align=right | 1.1 km || 
|-id=625 bgcolor=#E9E9E9
| 354625 ||  || — || March 9, 2005 || Kitt Peak || Spacewatch || — || align=right | 1.3 km || 
|-id=626 bgcolor=#d6d6d6
| 354626 ||  || — || March 10, 2005 || Mount Lemmon || Mount Lemmon Survey || SHU3:2 || align=right | 6.3 km || 
|-id=627 bgcolor=#E9E9E9
| 354627 ||  || — || March 12, 2005 || Socorro || LINEAR || BAR || align=right | 1.7 km || 
|-id=628 bgcolor=#fefefe
| 354628 ||  || — || March 10, 2005 || Catalina || CSS || H || align=right | 1.1 km || 
|-id=629 bgcolor=#E9E9E9
| 354629 ||  || — || March 10, 2005 || Mount Lemmon || Mount Lemmon Survey || — || align=right data-sort-value="0.81" | 810 m || 
|-id=630 bgcolor=#E9E9E9
| 354630 ||  || — || March 16, 2005 || Socorro || LINEAR || — || align=right | 1.1 km || 
|-id=631 bgcolor=#E9E9E9
| 354631 ||  || — || April 2, 2005 || Mount Lemmon || Mount Lemmon Survey || — || align=right data-sort-value="0.72" | 720 m || 
|-id=632 bgcolor=#E9E9E9
| 354632 ||  || — || April 5, 2005 || Palomar || NEAT || — || align=right | 1.6 km || 
|-id=633 bgcolor=#E9E9E9
| 354633 ||  || — || April 2, 2005 || Mount Lemmon || Mount Lemmon Survey || EUN || align=right | 1.5 km || 
|-id=634 bgcolor=#E9E9E9
| 354634 ||  || — || April 2, 2005 || Mount Lemmon || Mount Lemmon Survey || — || align=right | 1.5 km || 
|-id=635 bgcolor=#E9E9E9
| 354635 ||  || — || April 5, 2005 || Mount Lemmon || Mount Lemmon Survey || — || align=right | 1.00 km || 
|-id=636 bgcolor=#E9E9E9
| 354636 ||  || — || March 15, 2005 || Catalina || CSS || — || align=right | 1.6 km || 
|-id=637 bgcolor=#E9E9E9
| 354637 ||  || — || April 2, 2005 || Catalina || CSS || MAR || align=right | 1.3 km || 
|-id=638 bgcolor=#E9E9E9
| 354638 ||  || — || April 6, 2005 || Catalina || CSS || — || align=right | 2.6 km || 
|-id=639 bgcolor=#E9E9E9
| 354639 ||  || — || April 6, 2005 || Kitt Peak || Spacewatch || — || align=right | 1.5 km || 
|-id=640 bgcolor=#E9E9E9
| 354640 ||  || — || April 6, 2005 || Kitt Peak || Spacewatch || — || align=right | 1.6 km || 
|-id=641 bgcolor=#E9E9E9
| 354641 ||  || — || April 6, 2005 || Kitt Peak || Spacewatch || — || align=right data-sort-value="0.99" | 990 m || 
|-id=642 bgcolor=#E9E9E9
| 354642 ||  || — || April 9, 2005 || Kitt Peak || Spacewatch || — || align=right | 2.1 km || 
|-id=643 bgcolor=#E9E9E9
| 354643 ||  || — || April 2, 2005 || Mount Lemmon || Mount Lemmon Survey || — || align=right data-sort-value="0.75" | 750 m || 
|-id=644 bgcolor=#fefefe
| 354644 ||  || — || April 30, 2005 || Catalina || CSS || H || align=right data-sort-value="0.89" | 890 m || 
|-id=645 bgcolor=#E9E9E9
| 354645 ||  || — || May 4, 2005 || Mauna Kea || C. Veillet || RAF || align=right data-sort-value="0.99" | 990 m || 
|-id=646 bgcolor=#E9E9E9
| 354646 ||  || — || May 4, 2005 || Catalina || CSS || — || align=right | 2.1 km || 
|-id=647 bgcolor=#E9E9E9
| 354647 ||  || — || May 3, 2005 || Kitt Peak || Spacewatch || HNA || align=right | 2.3 km || 
|-id=648 bgcolor=#E9E9E9
| 354648 ||  || — || May 4, 2005 || Kitt Peak || Spacewatch || RAF || align=right | 1.1 km || 
|-id=649 bgcolor=#E9E9E9
| 354649 ||  || — || May 7, 2005 || Mount Lemmon || Mount Lemmon Survey || — || align=right | 2.3 km || 
|-id=650 bgcolor=#E9E9E9
| 354650 ||  || — || May 3, 2005 || Kitt Peak || DLS || HNS || align=right | 1.5 km || 
|-id=651 bgcolor=#E9E9E9
| 354651 ||  || — || May 9, 2005 || Kitt Peak || Spacewatch || — || align=right | 2.5 km || 
|-id=652 bgcolor=#E9E9E9
| 354652 ||  || — || May 10, 2005 || Mount Lemmon || Mount Lemmon Survey || — || align=right | 2.5 km || 
|-id=653 bgcolor=#E9E9E9
| 354653 ||  || — || May 13, 2005 || Kitt Peak || Spacewatch || AER || align=right | 2.6 km || 
|-id=654 bgcolor=#E9E9E9
| 354654 ||  || — || May 13, 2005 || Kitt Peak || Spacewatch || — || align=right | 2.4 km || 
|-id=655 bgcolor=#E9E9E9
| 354655 ||  || — || May 15, 2005 || Palomar || NEAT || — || align=right | 2.5 km || 
|-id=656 bgcolor=#E9E9E9
| 354656 ||  || — || May 15, 2005 || Palomar || NEAT || — || align=right | 1.8 km || 
|-id=657 bgcolor=#E9E9E9
| 354657 ||  || — || May 4, 2005 || Palomar || NEAT || — || align=right | 2.1 km || 
|-id=658 bgcolor=#E9E9E9
| 354658 ||  || — || May 8, 2005 || Mount Lemmon || Mount Lemmon Survey || — || align=right | 1.6 km || 
|-id=659 bgcolor=#E9E9E9
| 354659 Boileau ||  ||  || May 30, 2005 || Saint-Sulpice || Saint-Sulpice Obs. || GEF || align=right | 1.4 km || 
|-id=660 bgcolor=#E9E9E9
| 354660 ||  || — || June 1, 2005 || Kitt Peak || Spacewatch || WIT || align=right | 1.3 km || 
|-id=661 bgcolor=#E9E9E9
| 354661 ||  || — || June 3, 2005 || Kitt Peak || Spacewatch || — || align=right | 2.3 km || 
|-id=662 bgcolor=#E9E9E9
| 354662 ||  || — || June 6, 2005 || Kitt Peak || Spacewatch || — || align=right | 2.4 km || 
|-id=663 bgcolor=#FFC2E0
| 354663 ||  || — || June 9, 2005 || Siding Spring || SSS || AMO +1km || align=right | 2.0 km || 
|-id=664 bgcolor=#d6d6d6
| 354664 ||  || — || June 8, 2005 || Kitt Peak || Spacewatch || — || align=right | 3.3 km || 
|-id=665 bgcolor=#E9E9E9
| 354665 ||  || — || June 14, 2005 || Kitt Peak || Spacewatch || — || align=right | 2.6 km || 
|-id=666 bgcolor=#d6d6d6
| 354666 ||  || — || June 27, 2005 || Kitt Peak || Spacewatch || — || align=right | 2.8 km || 
|-id=667 bgcolor=#d6d6d6
| 354667 ||  || — || June 27, 2005 || Kitt Peak || Spacewatch || — || align=right | 3.2 km || 
|-id=668 bgcolor=#d6d6d6
| 354668 ||  || — || June 29, 2005 || Kitt Peak || Spacewatch || — || align=right | 4.8 km || 
|-id=669 bgcolor=#E9E9E9
| 354669 ||  || — || July 4, 2005 || Mount Lemmon || Mount Lemmon Survey || — || align=right | 2.7 km || 
|-id=670 bgcolor=#d6d6d6
| 354670 ||  || — || July 1, 2005 || Kitt Peak || Spacewatch || — || align=right | 2.4 km || 
|-id=671 bgcolor=#E9E9E9
| 354671 ||  || — || June 3, 2005 || Siding Spring || SSS || — || align=right | 2.0 km || 
|-id=672 bgcolor=#d6d6d6
| 354672 ||  || — || July 4, 2005 || Mount Lemmon || Mount Lemmon Survey || — || align=right | 2.3 km || 
|-id=673 bgcolor=#fefefe
| 354673 ||  || — || July 4, 2005 || Mount Lemmon || Mount Lemmon Survey || — || align=right | 1.0 km || 
|-id=674 bgcolor=#d6d6d6
| 354674 ||  || — || July 10, 2005 || Kitt Peak || Spacewatch || — || align=right | 3.1 km || 
|-id=675 bgcolor=#fefefe
| 354675 ||  || — || July 5, 2005 || Kitt Peak || Spacewatch || — || align=right data-sort-value="0.70" | 700 m || 
|-id=676 bgcolor=#d6d6d6
| 354676 ||  || — || July 5, 2005 || Kitt Peak || Spacewatch || — || align=right | 2.9 km || 
|-id=677 bgcolor=#E9E9E9
| 354677 ||  || — || July 6, 2005 || Kitt Peak || Spacewatch || — || align=right | 2.2 km || 
|-id=678 bgcolor=#E9E9E9
| 354678 ||  || — || July 15, 2005 || Mount Lemmon || Mount Lemmon Survey || — || align=right | 2.7 km || 
|-id=679 bgcolor=#E9E9E9
| 354679 ||  || — || July 28, 2005 || Reedy Creek || J. Broughton || — || align=right | 3.1 km || 
|-id=680 bgcolor=#d6d6d6
| 354680 ||  || — || July 26, 2005 || Palomar || NEAT || — || align=right | 3.0 km || 
|-id=681 bgcolor=#d6d6d6
| 354681 ||  || — || July 30, 2005 || Palomar || NEAT || EUP || align=right | 4.2 km || 
|-id=682 bgcolor=#d6d6d6
| 354682 ||  || — || July 31, 2005 || Palomar || NEAT || TIR || align=right | 3.5 km || 
|-id=683 bgcolor=#FA8072
| 354683 ||  || — || August 7, 2005 || Siding Spring || SSS || — || align=right | 1.9 km || 
|-id=684 bgcolor=#d6d6d6
| 354684 ||  || — || July 11, 2005 || Mount Lemmon || Mount Lemmon Survey || — || align=right | 2.8 km || 
|-id=685 bgcolor=#d6d6d6
| 354685 ||  || — || August 2, 2005 || Campo Imperatore || CINEOS || — || align=right | 3.7 km || 
|-id=686 bgcolor=#d6d6d6
| 354686 ||  || — || August 6, 2005 || Palomar || NEAT || — || align=right | 3.1 km || 
|-id=687 bgcolor=#d6d6d6
| 354687 ||  || — || July 30, 2005 || Palomar || NEAT || — || align=right | 3.7 km || 
|-id=688 bgcolor=#d6d6d6
| 354688 ||  || — || August 24, 2005 || Palomar || NEAT || — || align=right | 3.1 km || 
|-id=689 bgcolor=#d6d6d6
| 354689 ||  || — || August 27, 2005 || Kitt Peak || Spacewatch || — || align=right | 3.4 km || 
|-id=690 bgcolor=#d6d6d6
| 354690 ||  || — || August 25, 2005 || Palomar || NEAT || TIR || align=right | 4.1 km || 
|-id=691 bgcolor=#d6d6d6
| 354691 ||  || — || August 26, 2005 || Anderson Mesa || LONEOS || — || align=right | 3.1 km || 
|-id=692 bgcolor=#d6d6d6
| 354692 ||  || — || August 30, 2005 || Kitt Peak || Spacewatch || — || align=right | 3.9 km || 
|-id=693 bgcolor=#d6d6d6
| 354693 ||  || — || August 27, 2005 || Palomar || NEAT || — || align=right | 3.8 km || 
|-id=694 bgcolor=#d6d6d6
| 354694 ||  || — || August 27, 2005 || Palomar || NEAT || — || align=right | 3.5 km || 
|-id=695 bgcolor=#d6d6d6
| 354695 ||  || — || August 27, 2005 || Palomar || NEAT || — || align=right | 3.1 km || 
|-id=696 bgcolor=#E9E9E9
| 354696 ||  || — || August 28, 2005 || Kitt Peak || Spacewatch || DOR || align=right | 3.0 km || 
|-id=697 bgcolor=#d6d6d6
| 354697 ||  || — || August 27, 2005 || Anderson Mesa || LONEOS || — || align=right | 3.7 km || 
|-id=698 bgcolor=#d6d6d6
| 354698 ||  || — || August 31, 2005 || Palomar || NEAT || EOS || align=right | 2.1 km || 
|-id=699 bgcolor=#d6d6d6
| 354699 ||  || — || August 31, 2005 || Palomar || NEAT || — || align=right | 3.5 km || 
|-id=700 bgcolor=#d6d6d6
| 354700 ||  || — || August 30, 2005 || Kitt Peak || Spacewatch || — || align=right | 3.6 km || 
|}

354701–354800 

|-bgcolor=#d6d6d6
| 354701 ||  || — || August 29, 2005 || Kitt Peak || Spacewatch || — || align=right | 4.0 km || 
|-id=702 bgcolor=#d6d6d6
| 354702 ||  || — || August 30, 2005 || Kitt Peak || Spacewatch || VER || align=right | 2.6 km || 
|-id=703 bgcolor=#d6d6d6
| 354703 ||  || — || September 11, 2005 || Junk Bond || D. Healy || EOS || align=right | 2.5 km || 
|-id=704 bgcolor=#d6d6d6
| 354704 ||  || — || September 10, 2005 || Anderson Mesa || LONEOS || — || align=right | 3.6 km || 
|-id=705 bgcolor=#d6d6d6
| 354705 ||  || — || September 10, 2005 || Anderson Mesa || LONEOS || — || align=right | 4.0 km || 
|-id=706 bgcolor=#d6d6d6
| 354706 ||  || — || September 12, 2005 || Anderson Mesa || LONEOS || EUP || align=right | 5.6 km || 
|-id=707 bgcolor=#fefefe
| 354707 ||  || — || September 10, 2005 || Kingsnake || J. V. McClusky || — || align=right data-sort-value="0.67" | 670 m || 
|-id=708 bgcolor=#d6d6d6
| 354708 ||  || — || September 13, 2005 || Kitt Peak || Spacewatch || EOS || align=right | 2.1 km || 
|-id=709 bgcolor=#d6d6d6
| 354709 ||  || — || September 14, 2005 || Apache Point || A. C. Becker || — || align=right | 3.3 km || 
|-id=710 bgcolor=#d6d6d6
| 354710 ||  || — || September 13, 2005 || Apache Point || A. C. Becker || EOS || align=right | 2.1 km || 
|-id=711 bgcolor=#d6d6d6
| 354711 ||  || — || September 26, 2005 || Kitt Peak || Spacewatch || — || align=right | 3.4 km || 
|-id=712 bgcolor=#d6d6d6
| 354712 ||  || — || September 26, 2005 || Kitt Peak || Spacewatch || — || align=right | 3.0 km || 
|-id=713 bgcolor=#FFC2E0
| 354713 ||  || — || September 26, 2005 || Kitt Peak || Spacewatch || AMO +1km || align=right | 1.7 km || 
|-id=714 bgcolor=#d6d6d6
| 354714 ||  || — || September 24, 2005 || Piszkéstető || K. Sárneczky || — || align=right | 3.3 km || 
|-id=715 bgcolor=#d6d6d6
| 354715 ||  || — || September 24, 2005 || Kitt Peak || Spacewatch || — || align=right | 3.5 km || 
|-id=716 bgcolor=#fefefe
| 354716 ||  || — || September 24, 2005 || Kitt Peak || Spacewatch || — || align=right data-sort-value="0.72" | 720 m || 
|-id=717 bgcolor=#d6d6d6
| 354717 ||  || — || September 26, 2005 || Kitt Peak || Spacewatch || HYG || align=right | 3.2 km || 
|-id=718 bgcolor=#fefefe
| 354718 ||  || — || September 25, 2005 || Kitt Peak || Spacewatch || — || align=right data-sort-value="0.74" | 740 m || 
|-id=719 bgcolor=#d6d6d6
| 354719 ||  || — || September 26, 2005 || Catalina || CSS || — || align=right | 3.6 km || 
|-id=720 bgcolor=#d6d6d6
| 354720 ||  || — || September 28, 2005 || Palomar || NEAT || — || align=right | 3.6 km || 
|-id=721 bgcolor=#d6d6d6
| 354721 ||  || — || September 3, 2005 || Catalina || CSS || ARM || align=right | 4.0 km || 
|-id=722 bgcolor=#d6d6d6
| 354722 ||  || — || September 25, 2005 || Kitt Peak || Spacewatch || — || align=right | 2.3 km || 
|-id=723 bgcolor=#d6d6d6
| 354723 ||  || — || September 25, 2005 || Kitt Peak || Spacewatch || EOS || align=right | 2.4 km || 
|-id=724 bgcolor=#d6d6d6
| 354724 ||  || — || September 26, 2005 || Kitt Peak || Spacewatch || EOS || align=right | 1.9 km || 
|-id=725 bgcolor=#d6d6d6
| 354725 ||  || — || September 27, 2005 || Kitt Peak || Spacewatch || — || align=right | 2.9 km || 
|-id=726 bgcolor=#d6d6d6
| 354726 ||  || — || September 28, 2005 || Palomar || NEAT || — || align=right | 6.2 km || 
|-id=727 bgcolor=#d6d6d6
| 354727 ||  || — || September 29, 2005 || Kitt Peak || Spacewatch || — || align=right | 2.9 km || 
|-id=728 bgcolor=#d6d6d6
| 354728 ||  || — || September 29, 2005 || Kitt Peak || Spacewatch || — || align=right | 6.6 km || 
|-id=729 bgcolor=#fefefe
| 354729 ||  || — || September 29, 2005 || Catalina || CSS || — || align=right | 1.0 km || 
|-id=730 bgcolor=#d6d6d6
| 354730 ||  || — || September 29, 2005 || Kitt Peak || Spacewatch || VER || align=right | 3.5 km || 
|-id=731 bgcolor=#d6d6d6
| 354731 ||  || — || September 30, 2005 || Kitt Peak || Spacewatch || — || align=right | 3.2 km || 
|-id=732 bgcolor=#fefefe
| 354732 ||  || — || September 30, 2005 || Palomar || NEAT || — || align=right data-sort-value="0.79" | 790 m || 
|-id=733 bgcolor=#d6d6d6
| 354733 ||  || — || September 30, 2005 || Mount Lemmon || Mount Lemmon Survey || — || align=right | 3.4 km || 
|-id=734 bgcolor=#d6d6d6
| 354734 ||  || — || September 30, 2005 || Mount Lemmon || Mount Lemmon Survey || EUP || align=right | 4.0 km || 
|-id=735 bgcolor=#fefefe
| 354735 ||  || — || September 30, 2005 || Mount Lemmon || Mount Lemmon Survey || — || align=right data-sort-value="0.59" | 590 m || 
|-id=736 bgcolor=#d6d6d6
| 354736 ||  || — || September 14, 2005 || Kitt Peak || Spacewatch || EOS || align=right | 2.5 km || 
|-id=737 bgcolor=#d6d6d6
| 354737 ||  || — || September 23, 2005 || Kitt Peak || Spacewatch || THM || align=right | 2.1 km || 
|-id=738 bgcolor=#d6d6d6
| 354738 ||  || — || September 21, 2005 || Apache Point || A. C. Becker || — || align=right | 3.4 km || 
|-id=739 bgcolor=#d6d6d6
| 354739 ||  || — || September 27, 2005 || Apache Point || A. C. Becker || — || align=right | 2.4 km || 
|-id=740 bgcolor=#d6d6d6
| 354740 ||  || — || October 1, 2005 || Mount Lemmon || Mount Lemmon Survey || — || align=right | 3.6 km || 
|-id=741 bgcolor=#d6d6d6
| 354741 ||  || — || October 1, 2005 || Kitt Peak || Spacewatch || EOS || align=right | 1.7 km || 
|-id=742 bgcolor=#d6d6d6
| 354742 ||  || — || September 26, 2005 || Palomar || NEAT || — || align=right | 3.8 km || 
|-id=743 bgcolor=#d6d6d6
| 354743 ||  || — || October 6, 2005 || Kitt Peak || Spacewatch || — || align=right | 3.3 km || 
|-id=744 bgcolor=#d6d6d6
| 354744 ||  || — || September 10, 2005 || Anderson Mesa || LONEOS || — || align=right | 3.6 km || 
|-id=745 bgcolor=#fefefe
| 354745 ||  || — || October 3, 2005 || Socorro || LINEAR || — || align=right data-sort-value="0.75" | 750 m || 
|-id=746 bgcolor=#d6d6d6
| 354746 ||  || — || October 6, 2005 || Kitt Peak || Spacewatch || — || align=right | 3.2 km || 
|-id=747 bgcolor=#d6d6d6
| 354747 ||  || — || October 7, 2005 || Mount Lemmon || Mount Lemmon Survey || — || align=right | 3.6 km || 
|-id=748 bgcolor=#fefefe
| 354748 ||  || — || October 8, 2005 || Socorro || LINEAR || — || align=right data-sort-value="0.80" | 800 m || 
|-id=749 bgcolor=#d6d6d6
| 354749 ||  || — || October 7, 2005 || Kitt Peak || Spacewatch || — || align=right | 2.5 km || 
|-id=750 bgcolor=#d6d6d6
| 354750 ||  || — || October 8, 2005 || Kitt Peak || Spacewatch || HYG || align=right | 2.8 km || 
|-id=751 bgcolor=#d6d6d6
| 354751 ||  || — || October 8, 2005 || Kitt Peak || Spacewatch || VER || align=right | 2.4 km || 
|-id=752 bgcolor=#d6d6d6
| 354752 ||  || — || October 9, 2005 || Kitt Peak || Spacewatch || TEL || align=right | 1.6 km || 
|-id=753 bgcolor=#d6d6d6
| 354753 ||  || — || October 9, 2005 || Kitt Peak || Spacewatch || — || align=right | 3.0 km || 
|-id=754 bgcolor=#d6d6d6
| 354754 ||  || — || October 9, 2005 || Kitt Peak || Spacewatch || HYG || align=right | 3.3 km || 
|-id=755 bgcolor=#d6d6d6
| 354755 ||  || — || October 9, 2005 || Kitt Peak || Spacewatch || EOS || align=right | 2.6 km || 
|-id=756 bgcolor=#d6d6d6
| 354756 ||  || — || October 3, 2005 || Catalina || CSS || — || align=right | 4.3 km || 
|-id=757 bgcolor=#d6d6d6
| 354757 ||  || — || October 9, 2005 || Kitt Peak || Spacewatch || — || align=right | 3.1 km || 
|-id=758 bgcolor=#d6d6d6
| 354758 ||  || — || October 26, 2005 || Ottmarsheim || C. Rinner || — || align=right | 4.8 km || 
|-id=759 bgcolor=#fefefe
| 354759 ||  || — || October 23, 2005 || Catalina || CSS || — || align=right data-sort-value="0.93" | 930 m || 
|-id=760 bgcolor=#fefefe
| 354760 ||  || — || October 23, 2005 || Catalina || CSS || — || align=right data-sort-value="0.66" | 660 m || 
|-id=761 bgcolor=#d6d6d6
| 354761 ||  || — || September 24, 2005 || Kitt Peak || Spacewatch || — || align=right | 3.6 km || 
|-id=762 bgcolor=#fefefe
| 354762 ||  || — || October 22, 2005 || Palomar || NEAT || — || align=right data-sort-value="0.82" | 820 m || 
|-id=763 bgcolor=#fefefe
| 354763 ||  || — || October 23, 2005 || Palomar || NEAT || — || align=right data-sort-value="0.95" | 950 m || 
|-id=764 bgcolor=#fefefe
| 354764 ||  || — || October 23, 2005 || Palomar || NEAT || — || align=right data-sort-value="0.73" | 730 m || 
|-id=765 bgcolor=#d6d6d6
| 354765 ||  || — || September 29, 2005 || Catalina || CSS || TIR || align=right | 4.7 km || 
|-id=766 bgcolor=#fefefe
| 354766 ||  || — || October 23, 2005 || Palomar || NEAT || — || align=right data-sort-value="0.83" | 830 m || 
|-id=767 bgcolor=#fefefe
| 354767 ||  || — || October 31, 2005 || Mayhill || E. Guido || FLO || align=right data-sort-value="0.60" | 600 m || 
|-id=768 bgcolor=#d6d6d6
| 354768 ||  || — || October 22, 2005 || Kitt Peak || Spacewatch || — || align=right | 4.3 km || 
|-id=769 bgcolor=#d6d6d6
| 354769 ||  || — || October 22, 2005 || Kitt Peak || Spacewatch || URS || align=right | 5.7 km || 
|-id=770 bgcolor=#d6d6d6
| 354770 ||  || — || October 22, 2005 || Kitt Peak || Spacewatch || HYG || align=right | 3.0 km || 
|-id=771 bgcolor=#d6d6d6
| 354771 ||  || — || October 22, 2005 || Kitt Peak || Spacewatch || — || align=right | 3.6 km || 
|-id=772 bgcolor=#fefefe
| 354772 ||  || — || October 22, 2005 || Kitt Peak || Spacewatch || — || align=right data-sort-value="0.73" | 730 m || 
|-id=773 bgcolor=#fefefe
| 354773 ||  || — || October 22, 2005 || Kitt Peak || Spacewatch || — || align=right data-sort-value="0.63" | 630 m || 
|-id=774 bgcolor=#fefefe
| 354774 ||  || — || October 24, 2005 || Kitt Peak || Spacewatch || — || align=right data-sort-value="0.56" | 560 m || 
|-id=775 bgcolor=#d6d6d6
| 354775 ||  || — || October 24, 2005 || Kitt Peak || Spacewatch || — || align=right | 2.6 km || 
|-id=776 bgcolor=#d6d6d6
| 354776 ||  || — || October 24, 2005 || Kitt Peak || Spacewatch || MEL || align=right | 4.0 km || 
|-id=777 bgcolor=#fefefe
| 354777 ||  || — || October 25, 2005 || Mount Lemmon || Mount Lemmon Survey || FLO || align=right data-sort-value="0.56" | 560 m || 
|-id=778 bgcolor=#fefefe
| 354778 ||  || — || October 26, 2005 || Kitt Peak || Spacewatch || — || align=right data-sort-value="0.54" | 540 m || 
|-id=779 bgcolor=#d6d6d6
| 354779 ||  || — || October 24, 2005 || Kitt Peak || Spacewatch || EOS || align=right | 2.3 km || 
|-id=780 bgcolor=#d6d6d6
| 354780 ||  || — || October 24, 2005 || Kitt Peak || Spacewatch || — || align=right | 2.8 km || 
|-id=781 bgcolor=#d6d6d6
| 354781 ||  || — || October 24, 2005 || Kitt Peak || Spacewatch || — || align=right | 2.8 km || 
|-id=782 bgcolor=#fefefe
| 354782 ||  || — || October 24, 2005 || Kitt Peak || Spacewatch || — || align=right data-sort-value="0.70" | 700 m || 
|-id=783 bgcolor=#d6d6d6
| 354783 ||  || — || October 25, 2005 || Kitt Peak || Spacewatch || — || align=right | 3.2 km || 
|-id=784 bgcolor=#fefefe
| 354784 ||  || — || October 25, 2005 || Kitt Peak || Spacewatch || — || align=right data-sort-value="0.86" | 860 m || 
|-id=785 bgcolor=#d6d6d6
| 354785 ||  || — || October 26, 2005 || Kitt Peak || Spacewatch || — || align=right | 4.6 km || 
|-id=786 bgcolor=#d6d6d6
| 354786 ||  || — || October 23, 2005 || Palomar || NEAT || URS || align=right | 3.6 km || 
|-id=787 bgcolor=#d6d6d6
| 354787 ||  || — || October 25, 2005 || Kitt Peak || Spacewatch || — || align=right | 4.0 km || 
|-id=788 bgcolor=#fefefe
| 354788 ||  || — || October 25, 2005 || Kitt Peak || Spacewatch || — || align=right data-sort-value="0.74" | 740 m || 
|-id=789 bgcolor=#fefefe
| 354789 ||  || — || October 24, 2005 || Kitt Peak || Spacewatch || — || align=right data-sort-value="0.66" | 660 m || 
|-id=790 bgcolor=#d6d6d6
| 354790 ||  || — || October 26, 2005 || Kitt Peak || Spacewatch || — || align=right | 3.2 km || 
|-id=791 bgcolor=#d6d6d6
| 354791 ||  || — || October 28, 2005 || Catalina || CSS || — || align=right | 3.0 km || 
|-id=792 bgcolor=#fefefe
| 354792 ||  || — || October 27, 2005 || Kitt Peak || Spacewatch || — || align=right data-sort-value="0.83" | 830 m || 
|-id=793 bgcolor=#d6d6d6
| 354793 ||  || — || October 29, 2005 || Catalina || CSS || — || align=right | 3.0 km || 
|-id=794 bgcolor=#fefefe
| 354794 ||  || — || October 30, 2005 || Mount Lemmon || Mount Lemmon Survey || — || align=right data-sort-value="0.73" | 730 m || 
|-id=795 bgcolor=#d6d6d6
| 354795 ||  || — || October 23, 2005 || Kitt Peak || Spacewatch || — || align=right | 3.3 km || 
|-id=796 bgcolor=#d6d6d6
| 354796 ||  || — || October 25, 2005 || Apache Point || A. C. Becker || — || align=right | 2.5 km || 
|-id=797 bgcolor=#d6d6d6
| 354797 ||  || — || October 25, 2005 || Apache Point || A. C. Becker || VER || align=right | 2.6 km || 
|-id=798 bgcolor=#d6d6d6
| 354798 ||  || — || October 25, 2005 || Apache Point || A. C. Becker || — || align=right | 3.9 km || 
|-id=799 bgcolor=#d6d6d6
| 354799 ||  || — || October 26, 2005 || Apache Point || A. C. Becker || — || align=right | 2.1 km || 
|-id=800 bgcolor=#d6d6d6
| 354800 ||  || — || October 26, 2005 || Apache Point || A. C. Becker || — || align=right | 4.6 km || 
|}

354801–354900 

|-bgcolor=#d6d6d6
| 354801 ||  || — || October 27, 2005 || Apache Point || A. C. Becker || — || align=right | 3.1 km || 
|-id=802 bgcolor=#d6d6d6
| 354802 ||  || — || February 27, 2008 || Kitt Peak || Spacewatch || — || align=right | 4.1 km || 
|-id=803 bgcolor=#d6d6d6
| 354803 ||  || — || November 2, 2005 || Mount Lemmon || Mount Lemmon Survey || — || align=right | 3.1 km || 
|-id=804 bgcolor=#fefefe
| 354804 ||  || — || November 5, 2005 || Kitt Peak || Spacewatch || — || align=right data-sort-value="0.93" | 930 m || 
|-id=805 bgcolor=#fefefe
| 354805 ||  || — || November 6, 2005 || Kitt Peak || Spacewatch || — || align=right data-sort-value="0.64" | 640 m || 
|-id=806 bgcolor=#d6d6d6
| 354806 ||  || — || November 1, 2005 || Kitt Peak || Spacewatch || — || align=right | 3.9 km || 
|-id=807 bgcolor=#d6d6d6
| 354807 ||  || — || November 4, 2005 || Catalina || CSS || EUP || align=right | 6.2 km || 
|-id=808 bgcolor=#d6d6d6
| 354808 ||  || — || November 5, 2005 || Catalina || CSS || — || align=right | 3.9 km || 
|-id=809 bgcolor=#d6d6d6
| 354809 ||  || — || November 1, 2005 || Apache Point || A. C. Becker || — || align=right | 2.9 km || 
|-id=810 bgcolor=#d6d6d6
| 354810 ||  || — || November 1, 2005 || Apache Point || A. C. Becker || — || align=right | 3.0 km || 
|-id=811 bgcolor=#fefefe
| 354811 ||  || — || November 21, 2005 || Kitt Peak || Spacewatch || — || align=right data-sort-value="0.62" | 620 m || 
|-id=812 bgcolor=#fefefe
| 354812 ||  || — || November 21, 2005 || Kitt Peak || Spacewatch || — || align=right data-sort-value="0.77" | 770 m || 
|-id=813 bgcolor=#fefefe
| 354813 ||  || — || October 30, 2005 || Mount Lemmon || Mount Lemmon Survey || — || align=right data-sort-value="0.90" | 900 m || 
|-id=814 bgcolor=#fefefe
| 354814 ||  || — || November 21, 2005 || Kitt Peak || Spacewatch || — || align=right data-sort-value="0.64" | 640 m || 
|-id=815 bgcolor=#d6d6d6
| 354815 ||  || — || November 21, 2005 || Kitt Peak || Spacewatch || — || align=right | 4.3 km || 
|-id=816 bgcolor=#d6d6d6
| 354816 ||  || — || November 6, 2005 || Mount Lemmon || Mount Lemmon Survey || SYL7:4 || align=right | 3.9 km || 
|-id=817 bgcolor=#d6d6d6
| 354817 ||  || — || November 25, 2005 || Kitt Peak || Spacewatch || — || align=right | 3.8 km || 
|-id=818 bgcolor=#fefefe
| 354818 ||  || — || November 25, 2005 || Kitt Peak || Spacewatch || — || align=right data-sort-value="0.85" | 850 m || 
|-id=819 bgcolor=#fefefe
| 354819 ||  || — || November 26, 2005 || Kitt Peak || Spacewatch || — || align=right | 1.0 km || 
|-id=820 bgcolor=#FA8072
| 354820 ||  || — || November 26, 2005 || Mount Lemmon || Mount Lemmon Survey || — || align=right data-sort-value="0.97" | 970 m || 
|-id=821 bgcolor=#fefefe
| 354821 ||  || — || November 29, 2005 || Socorro || LINEAR || — || align=right data-sort-value="0.82" | 820 m || 
|-id=822 bgcolor=#fefefe
| 354822 ||  || — || November 27, 2005 || Anderson Mesa || LONEOS || PHO || align=right | 1.2 km || 
|-id=823 bgcolor=#fefefe
| 354823 ||  || — || November 28, 2005 || Socorro || LINEAR || — || align=right | 1.0 km || 
|-id=824 bgcolor=#fefefe
| 354824 ||  || — || November 25, 2005 || Mount Lemmon || Mount Lemmon Survey || V || align=right data-sort-value="0.62" | 620 m || 
|-id=825 bgcolor=#d6d6d6
| 354825 ||  || — || November 29, 2005 || Catalina || CSS || 7:4* || align=right | 3.2 km || 
|-id=826 bgcolor=#fefefe
| 354826 ||  || — || November 30, 2005 || Kitt Peak || Spacewatch || — || align=right data-sort-value="0.86" | 860 m || 
|-id=827 bgcolor=#fefefe
| 354827 ||  || — || November 21, 2005 || Kitt Peak || Spacewatch || — || align=right data-sort-value="0.91" | 910 m || 
|-id=828 bgcolor=#d6d6d6
| 354828 ||  || — || December 1, 2005 || Mount Lemmon || Mount Lemmon Survey || — || align=right | 4.4 km || 
|-id=829 bgcolor=#d6d6d6
| 354829 ||  || — || December 1, 2005 || Mount Lemmon || Mount Lemmon Survey || — || align=right | 2.8 km || 
|-id=830 bgcolor=#fefefe
| 354830 ||  || — || December 2, 2005 || Kitt Peak || Spacewatch || — || align=right data-sort-value="0.73" | 730 m || 
|-id=831 bgcolor=#fefefe
| 354831 ||  || — || December 2, 2005 || Mount Lemmon || Mount Lemmon Survey || — || align=right data-sort-value="0.70" | 700 m || 
|-id=832 bgcolor=#fefefe
| 354832 ||  || — || December 4, 2005 || Socorro || LINEAR || FLO || align=right data-sort-value="0.74" | 740 m || 
|-id=833 bgcolor=#fefefe
| 354833 ||  || — || December 2, 2005 || Kitt Peak || Spacewatch || — || align=right data-sort-value="0.64" | 640 m || 
|-id=834 bgcolor=#fefefe
| 354834 ||  || — || December 4, 2005 || Kitt Peak || Spacewatch || — || align=right data-sort-value="0.92" | 920 m || 
|-id=835 bgcolor=#fefefe
| 354835 || 2005 YB || — || December 19, 2005 || Wrightwood || J. W. Young || — || align=right data-sort-value="0.70" | 700 m || 
|-id=836 bgcolor=#fefefe
| 354836 ||  || — || December 21, 2005 || Kitt Peak || Spacewatch || — || align=right data-sort-value="0.76" | 760 m || 
|-id=837 bgcolor=#fefefe
| 354837 ||  || — || December 22, 2005 || Kitt Peak || Spacewatch || FLO || align=right data-sort-value="0.81" | 810 m || 
|-id=838 bgcolor=#fefefe
| 354838 ||  || — || December 24, 2005 || Kitt Peak || Spacewatch || — || align=right data-sort-value="0.70" | 700 m || 
|-id=839 bgcolor=#d6d6d6
| 354839 ||  || — || December 22, 2005 || Kitt Peak || Spacewatch || SYL7:4 || align=right | 4.4 km || 
|-id=840 bgcolor=#fefefe
| 354840 ||  || — || December 22, 2005 || Kitt Peak || Spacewatch || — || align=right data-sort-value="0.77" | 770 m || 
|-id=841 bgcolor=#fefefe
| 354841 ||  || — || December 26, 2005 || Mount Lemmon || Mount Lemmon Survey || — || align=right data-sort-value="0.77" | 770 m || 
|-id=842 bgcolor=#d6d6d6
| 354842 ||  || — || December 25, 2005 || Kitt Peak || Spacewatch || 7:4 || align=right | 5.3 km || 
|-id=843 bgcolor=#fefefe
| 354843 ||  || — || December 25, 2005 || Kitt Peak || Spacewatch || FLO || align=right data-sort-value="0.68" | 680 m || 
|-id=844 bgcolor=#fefefe
| 354844 ||  || — || December 27, 2005 || Mount Lemmon || Mount Lemmon Survey || NYS || align=right data-sort-value="0.53" | 530 m || 
|-id=845 bgcolor=#fefefe
| 354845 ||  || — || December 26, 2005 || Kitt Peak || Spacewatch || FLO || align=right data-sort-value="0.77" | 770 m || 
|-id=846 bgcolor=#fefefe
| 354846 ||  || — || December 25, 2005 || Mount Lemmon || Mount Lemmon Survey || FLO || align=right data-sort-value="0.63" | 630 m || 
|-id=847 bgcolor=#fefefe
| 354847 ||  || — || December 25, 2005 || Mount Lemmon || Mount Lemmon Survey || — || align=right data-sort-value="0.76" | 760 m || 
|-id=848 bgcolor=#fefefe
| 354848 ||  || — || December 26, 2005 || Kitt Peak || Spacewatch || — || align=right data-sort-value="0.78" | 780 m || 
|-id=849 bgcolor=#fefefe
| 354849 ||  || — || December 26, 2005 || Kitt Peak || Spacewatch || — || align=right data-sort-value="0.75" | 750 m || 
|-id=850 bgcolor=#fefefe
| 354850 ||  || — || December 25, 2005 || Kitt Peak || Spacewatch || — || align=right data-sort-value="0.73" | 730 m || 
|-id=851 bgcolor=#fefefe
| 354851 ||  || — || December 25, 2005 || Kitt Peak || Spacewatch || — || align=right data-sort-value="0.76" | 760 m || 
|-id=852 bgcolor=#fefefe
| 354852 ||  || — || December 22, 2005 || Catalina || CSS || PHO || align=right | 1.2 km || 
|-id=853 bgcolor=#fefefe
| 354853 ||  || — || December 30, 2005 || Kitt Peak || Spacewatch || — || align=right data-sort-value="0.77" | 770 m || 
|-id=854 bgcolor=#fefefe
| 354854 ||  || — || December 26, 2005 || Kitt Peak || Spacewatch || — || align=right data-sort-value="0.90" | 900 m || 
|-id=855 bgcolor=#fefefe
| 354855 ||  || — || December 25, 2005 || Mount Lemmon || Mount Lemmon Survey || FLO || align=right data-sort-value="0.53" | 530 m || 
|-id=856 bgcolor=#fefefe
| 354856 ||  || — || December 25, 2005 || Mount Lemmon || Mount Lemmon Survey || — || align=right data-sort-value="0.62" | 620 m || 
|-id=857 bgcolor=#fefefe
| 354857 ||  || — || December 29, 2005 || Catalina || CSS || — || align=right data-sort-value="0.93" | 930 m || 
|-id=858 bgcolor=#fefefe
| 354858 ||  || — || December 30, 2005 || Socorro || LINEAR || — || align=right data-sort-value="0.99" | 990 m || 
|-id=859 bgcolor=#fefefe
| 354859 ||  || — || December 28, 2005 || Palomar || NEAT || PHO || align=right | 1.2 km || 
|-id=860 bgcolor=#d6d6d6
| 354860 ||  || — || December 28, 2005 || Mount Lemmon || Mount Lemmon Survey || 7:4 || align=right | 4.6 km || 
|-id=861 bgcolor=#fefefe
| 354861 ||  || — || December 27, 2005 || Kitt Peak || Spacewatch || FLO || align=right data-sort-value="0.90" | 900 m || 
|-id=862 bgcolor=#fefefe
| 354862 ||  || — || January 5, 2006 || Catalina || CSS || FLO || align=right data-sort-value="0.81" | 810 m || 
|-id=863 bgcolor=#fefefe
| 354863 ||  || — || January 4, 2006 || Kitt Peak || Spacewatch || — || align=right data-sort-value="0.70" | 700 m || 
|-id=864 bgcolor=#fefefe
| 354864 ||  || — || January 7, 2006 || Mount Lemmon || Mount Lemmon Survey || — || align=right data-sort-value="0.70" | 700 m || 
|-id=865 bgcolor=#fefefe
| 354865 ||  || — || January 6, 2006 || Mount Lemmon || Mount Lemmon Survey || — || align=right data-sort-value="0.87" | 870 m || 
|-id=866 bgcolor=#fefefe
| 354866 ||  || — || January 6, 2006 || Kitt Peak || Spacewatch || — || align=right data-sort-value="0.89" | 890 m || 
|-id=867 bgcolor=#fefefe
| 354867 ||  || — || January 4, 2006 || Kitt Peak || Spacewatch || ERI || align=right | 1.8 km || 
|-id=868 bgcolor=#fefefe
| 354868 ||  || — || January 6, 2006 || Kitt Peak || Spacewatch || FLO || align=right data-sort-value="0.55" | 550 m || 
|-id=869 bgcolor=#fefefe
| 354869 ||  || — || January 21, 2006 || Kitt Peak || Spacewatch || FLO || align=right data-sort-value="0.65" | 650 m || 
|-id=870 bgcolor=#fefefe
| 354870 ||  || — || January 7, 2006 || Mount Lemmon || Mount Lemmon Survey || — || align=right | 1.2 km || 
|-id=871 bgcolor=#fefefe
| 354871 ||  || — || January 23, 2006 || Socorro || LINEAR || — || align=right data-sort-value="0.71" | 710 m || 
|-id=872 bgcolor=#fefefe
| 354872 ||  || — || January 23, 2006 || Socorro || LINEAR || — || align=right data-sort-value="0.75" | 750 m || 
|-id=873 bgcolor=#fefefe
| 354873 ||  || — || January 23, 2006 || Kitt Peak || Spacewatch || — || align=right data-sort-value="0.89" | 890 m || 
|-id=874 bgcolor=#fefefe
| 354874 ||  || — || January 23, 2006 || Kitt Peak || Spacewatch || — || align=right data-sort-value="0.97" | 970 m || 
|-id=875 bgcolor=#fefefe
| 354875 ||  || — || January 25, 2006 || Kitt Peak || Spacewatch || FLO || align=right data-sort-value="0.73" | 730 m || 
|-id=876 bgcolor=#FFC2E0
| 354876 ||  || — || January 26, 2006 || Mount Lemmon || Mount Lemmon Survey || APO || align=right data-sort-value="0.72" | 720 m || 
|-id=877 bgcolor=#fefefe
| 354877 ||  || — || January 22, 2006 || Mount Lemmon || Mount Lemmon Survey || NYS || align=right data-sort-value="0.51" | 510 m || 
|-id=878 bgcolor=#fefefe
| 354878 ||  || — || January 23, 2006 || Kitt Peak || Spacewatch || FLO || align=right data-sort-value="0.59" | 590 m || 
|-id=879 bgcolor=#fefefe
| 354879 ||  || — || March 26, 1996 || Kitt Peak || Spacewatch || NYS || align=right data-sort-value="0.58" | 580 m || 
|-id=880 bgcolor=#fefefe
| 354880 ||  || — || January 23, 2006 || Kitt Peak || Spacewatch || V || align=right data-sort-value="0.52" | 520 m || 
|-id=881 bgcolor=#fefefe
| 354881 ||  || — || January 25, 2006 || Kitt Peak || Spacewatch || — || align=right data-sort-value="0.86" | 860 m || 
|-id=882 bgcolor=#fefefe
| 354882 ||  || — || January 25, 2006 || Kitt Peak || Spacewatch || FLO || align=right data-sort-value="0.57" | 570 m || 
|-id=883 bgcolor=#fefefe
| 354883 ||  || — || January 26, 2006 || Kitt Peak || Spacewatch || — || align=right data-sort-value="0.81" | 810 m || 
|-id=884 bgcolor=#fefefe
| 354884 ||  || — || January 26, 2006 || Kitt Peak || Spacewatch || — || align=right data-sort-value="0.81" | 810 m || 
|-id=885 bgcolor=#fefefe
| 354885 ||  || — || January 28, 2006 || Mount Lemmon || Mount Lemmon Survey || — || align=right data-sort-value="0.77" | 770 m || 
|-id=886 bgcolor=#fefefe
| 354886 ||  || — || January 27, 2006 || Mount Lemmon || Mount Lemmon Survey || — || align=right data-sort-value="0.57" | 570 m || 
|-id=887 bgcolor=#fefefe
| 354887 ||  || — || January 31, 2006 || 7300 Observatory || W. K. Y. Yeung || — || align=right | 1.2 km || 
|-id=888 bgcolor=#fefefe
| 354888 ||  || — || January 26, 2006 || Mount Lemmon || Mount Lemmon Survey || V || align=right data-sort-value="0.71" | 710 m || 
|-id=889 bgcolor=#fefefe
| 354889 ||  || — || January 27, 2006 || Anderson Mesa || LONEOS || — || align=right data-sort-value="0.71" | 710 m || 
|-id=890 bgcolor=#fefefe
| 354890 ||  || — || January 28, 2006 || Mount Lemmon || Mount Lemmon Survey || — || align=right data-sort-value="0.65" | 650 m || 
|-id=891 bgcolor=#fefefe
| 354891 ||  || — || January 30, 2006 || Kitt Peak || Spacewatch || FLO || align=right data-sort-value="0.80" | 800 m || 
|-id=892 bgcolor=#fefefe
| 354892 ||  || — || January 31, 2006 || Kitt Peak || Spacewatch || — || align=right data-sort-value="0.62" | 620 m || 
|-id=893 bgcolor=#fefefe
| 354893 ||  || — || January 22, 2006 || Catalina || CSS || — || align=right data-sort-value="0.83" | 830 m || 
|-id=894 bgcolor=#fefefe
| 354894 ||  || — || January 31, 2006 || Kitt Peak || Spacewatch || FLO || align=right data-sort-value="0.79" | 790 m || 
|-id=895 bgcolor=#fefefe
| 354895 ||  || — || January 31, 2006 || Kitt Peak || Spacewatch || — || align=right | 1.1 km || 
|-id=896 bgcolor=#fefefe
| 354896 ||  || — || January 31, 2006 || Kitt Peak || Spacewatch || — || align=right | 1.8 km || 
|-id=897 bgcolor=#fefefe
| 354897 ||  || — || January 31, 2006 || Kitt Peak || Spacewatch || FLO || align=right data-sort-value="0.58" | 580 m || 
|-id=898 bgcolor=#fefefe
| 354898 ||  || — || January 26, 2006 || Catalina || CSS || FLO || align=right data-sort-value="0.85" | 850 m || 
|-id=899 bgcolor=#fefefe
| 354899 ||  || — || January 27, 2006 || Catalina || CSS || LCI || align=right | 1.5 km || 
|-id=900 bgcolor=#fefefe
| 354900 ||  || — || January 28, 2006 || Catalina || CSS || PHO || align=right | 3.3 km || 
|}

354901–355000 

|-bgcolor=#fefefe
| 354901 ||  || — || January 30, 2006 || Kitt Peak || Spacewatch || — || align=right data-sort-value="0.64" | 640 m || 
|-id=902 bgcolor=#fefefe
| 354902 ||  || — || January 28, 2006 || Mount Lemmon || Mount Lemmon Survey || — || align=right data-sort-value="0.58" | 580 m || 
|-id=903 bgcolor=#fefefe
| 354903 ||  || — || December 2, 2005 || Kitt Peak || L. H. Wasserman || MAS || align=right data-sort-value="0.75" | 750 m || 
|-id=904 bgcolor=#fefefe
| 354904 ||  || — || February 2, 2006 || Kitt Peak || Spacewatch || — || align=right | 1.1 km || 
|-id=905 bgcolor=#fefefe
| 354905 ||  || — || February 2, 2006 || Kitt Peak || Spacewatch || FLO || align=right data-sort-value="0.68" | 680 m || 
|-id=906 bgcolor=#fefefe
| 354906 ||  || — || February 2, 2006 || Mount Lemmon || Mount Lemmon Survey || — || align=right data-sort-value="0.98" | 980 m || 
|-id=907 bgcolor=#fefefe
| 354907 ||  || — || February 2, 2006 || Kitt Peak || Spacewatch || — || align=right data-sort-value="0.92" | 920 m || 
|-id=908 bgcolor=#fefefe
| 354908 ||  || — || February 13, 2006 || Palomar || NEAT || — || align=right | 1.4 km || 
|-id=909 bgcolor=#fefefe
| 354909 ||  || — || February 20, 2006 || Catalina || CSS || KLI || align=right | 1.8 km || 
|-id=910 bgcolor=#fefefe
| 354910 ||  || — || February 21, 2006 || Catalina || CSS || — || align=right | 1.5 km || 
|-id=911 bgcolor=#fefefe
| 354911 ||  || — || February 20, 2006 || Kitt Peak || Spacewatch || — || align=right data-sort-value="0.96" | 960 m || 
|-id=912 bgcolor=#fefefe
| 354912 ||  || — || February 20, 2006 || Kitt Peak || Spacewatch || — || align=right data-sort-value="0.78" | 780 m || 
|-id=913 bgcolor=#fefefe
| 354913 ||  || — || February 20, 2006 || Kitt Peak || Spacewatch || V || align=right data-sort-value="0.73" | 730 m || 
|-id=914 bgcolor=#fefefe
| 354914 ||  || — || February 20, 2006 || Mount Lemmon || Mount Lemmon Survey || V || align=right data-sort-value="0.87" | 870 m || 
|-id=915 bgcolor=#fefefe
| 354915 ||  || — || February 7, 2006 || Mount Lemmon || Mount Lemmon Survey || V || align=right data-sort-value="0.66" | 660 m || 
|-id=916 bgcolor=#fefefe
| 354916 ||  || — || February 20, 2006 || Kitt Peak || Spacewatch || — || align=right data-sort-value="0.69" | 690 m || 
|-id=917 bgcolor=#fefefe
| 354917 ||  || — || February 20, 2006 || Kitt Peak || Spacewatch || — || align=right data-sort-value="0.86" | 860 m || 
|-id=918 bgcolor=#fefefe
| 354918 ||  || — || February 20, 2006 || Kitt Peak || Spacewatch || NYS || align=right data-sort-value="0.63" | 630 m || 
|-id=919 bgcolor=#fefefe
| 354919 ||  || — || February 20, 2006 || Kitt Peak || Spacewatch || — || align=right data-sort-value="0.98" | 980 m || 
|-id=920 bgcolor=#fefefe
| 354920 ||  || — || February 24, 2006 || Kitt Peak || Spacewatch || V || align=right data-sort-value="0.59" | 590 m || 
|-id=921 bgcolor=#fefefe
| 354921 ||  || — || February 24, 2006 || Kitt Peak || Spacewatch || — || align=right data-sort-value="0.79" | 790 m || 
|-id=922 bgcolor=#fefefe
| 354922 ||  || — || February 24, 2006 || Kitt Peak || Spacewatch || — || align=right | 1.6 km || 
|-id=923 bgcolor=#fefefe
| 354923 ||  || — || February 27, 2006 || Kitt Peak || Spacewatch || NYS || align=right data-sort-value="0.66" | 660 m || 
|-id=924 bgcolor=#fefefe
| 354924 ||  || — || February 27, 2006 || Mayhill || A. Lowe || — || align=right data-sort-value="0.81" | 810 m || 
|-id=925 bgcolor=#fefefe
| 354925 ||  || — || February 20, 2006 || Catalina || CSS || NYS || align=right data-sort-value="0.93" | 930 m || 
|-id=926 bgcolor=#fefefe
| 354926 ||  || — || February 25, 2006 || Kitt Peak || Spacewatch || V || align=right data-sort-value="0.64" | 640 m || 
|-id=927 bgcolor=#fefefe
| 354927 ||  || — || February 25, 2006 || Kitt Peak || Spacewatch || NYS || align=right data-sort-value="0.66" | 660 m || 
|-id=928 bgcolor=#fefefe
| 354928 ||  || — || February 25, 2006 || Kitt Peak || Spacewatch || — || align=right | 1.0 km || 
|-id=929 bgcolor=#fefefe
| 354929 ||  || — || February 25, 2006 || Kitt Peak || Spacewatch || V || align=right data-sort-value="0.60" | 600 m || 
|-id=930 bgcolor=#fefefe
| 354930 ||  || — || February 25, 2006 || Kitt Peak || Spacewatch || — || align=right data-sort-value="0.96" | 960 m || 
|-id=931 bgcolor=#fefefe
| 354931 ||  || — || February 27, 2006 || Kitt Peak || Spacewatch || NYS || align=right data-sort-value="0.92" | 920 m || 
|-id=932 bgcolor=#fefefe
| 354932 ||  || — || February 27, 2006 || Kitt Peak || Spacewatch || NYS || align=right data-sort-value="0.62" | 620 m || 
|-id=933 bgcolor=#fefefe
| 354933 ||  || — || July 5, 2003 || Kitt Peak || Spacewatch || NYS || align=right data-sort-value="0.68" | 680 m || 
|-id=934 bgcolor=#fefefe
| 354934 ||  || — || February 22, 2006 || Mount Lemmon || Mount Lemmon Survey || ERI || align=right | 1.9 km || 
|-id=935 bgcolor=#fefefe
| 354935 ||  || — || February 27, 2006 || Kitt Peak || Spacewatch || — || align=right data-sort-value="0.88" | 880 m || 
|-id=936 bgcolor=#fefefe
| 354936 ||  || — || March 2, 2006 || Kitt Peak || Spacewatch || FLO || align=right data-sort-value="0.60" | 600 m || 
|-id=937 bgcolor=#fefefe
| 354937 ||  || — || March 2, 2006 || Mount Lemmon || Mount Lemmon Survey || V || align=right data-sort-value="0.68" | 680 m || 
|-id=938 bgcolor=#fefefe
| 354938 ||  || — || March 2, 2006 || Kitt Peak || Spacewatch || — || align=right data-sort-value="0.83" | 830 m || 
|-id=939 bgcolor=#fefefe
| 354939 ||  || — || March 3, 2006 || Kitt Peak || Spacewatch || NYS || align=right data-sort-value="0.61" | 610 m || 
|-id=940 bgcolor=#fefefe
| 354940 ||  || — || March 3, 2006 || Kitt Peak || Spacewatch || EUT || align=right data-sort-value="0.69" | 690 m || 
|-id=941 bgcolor=#fefefe
| 354941 ||  || — || March 3, 2006 || Kitt Peak || Spacewatch || NYS || align=right data-sort-value="0.54" | 540 m || 
|-id=942 bgcolor=#fefefe
| 354942 ||  || — || March 4, 2006 || Kitt Peak || Spacewatch || — || align=right data-sort-value="0.94" | 940 m || 
|-id=943 bgcolor=#fefefe
| 354943 ||  || — || March 4, 2006 || Kitt Peak || Spacewatch || NYS || align=right data-sort-value="0.78" | 780 m || 
|-id=944 bgcolor=#fefefe
| 354944 ||  || — || March 5, 2006 || Kitt Peak || Spacewatch || FLO || align=right data-sort-value="0.74" | 740 m || 
|-id=945 bgcolor=#fefefe
| 354945 ||  || — || February 24, 2006 || Kitt Peak || Spacewatch || V || align=right data-sort-value="0.68" | 680 m || 
|-id=946 bgcolor=#d6d6d6
| 354946 ||  || — || March 5, 2006 || Kitt Peak || Spacewatch || 3:2 || align=right | 6.7 km || 
|-id=947 bgcolor=#fefefe
| 354947 ||  || — || October 7, 2005 || Mauna Kea || A. Boattini || — || align=right data-sort-value="0.89" | 890 m || 
|-id=948 bgcolor=#fefefe
| 354948 ||  || — || January 8, 2006 || Mount Lemmon || Mount Lemmon Survey || ERI || align=right | 1.8 km || 
|-id=949 bgcolor=#fefefe
| 354949 ||  || — || March 5, 2006 || Kitt Peak || Spacewatch || — || align=right data-sort-value="0.76" | 760 m || 
|-id=950 bgcolor=#fefefe
| 354950 ||  || — || March 5, 2006 || Mount Lemmon || Mount Lemmon Survey || FLO || align=right data-sort-value="0.57" | 570 m || 
|-id=951 bgcolor=#fefefe
| 354951 ||  || — || March 19, 2006 || Bergisch Gladbach || W. Bickel || — || align=right data-sort-value="0.85" | 850 m || 
|-id=952 bgcolor=#FFC2E0
| 354952 ||  || — || March 24, 2006 || Socorro || LINEAR || AMO || align=right data-sort-value="0.50" | 500 m || 
|-id=953 bgcolor=#fefefe
| 354953 ||  || — || March 4, 2006 || Catalina || CSS || ERI || align=right | 1.7 km || 
|-id=954 bgcolor=#fefefe
| 354954 ||  || — || March 24, 2006 || Kitt Peak || Spacewatch || — || align=right data-sort-value="0.84" | 840 m || 
|-id=955 bgcolor=#fefefe
| 354955 ||  || — || March 24, 2006 || Socorro || LINEAR || — || align=right | 1.1 km || 
|-id=956 bgcolor=#fefefe
| 354956 ||  || — || January 27, 2006 || Mount Lemmon || Mount Lemmon Survey || NYS || align=right data-sort-value="0.75" | 750 m || 
|-id=957 bgcolor=#fefefe
| 354957 ||  || — || April 2, 2006 || Kitt Peak || Spacewatch || MAS || align=right data-sort-value="0.87" | 870 m || 
|-id=958 bgcolor=#fefefe
| 354958 ||  || — || April 1, 2006 || Socorro || LINEAR || FLO || align=right | 1.0 km || 
|-id=959 bgcolor=#fefefe
| 354959 ||  || — || April 7, 2006 || Anderson Mesa || LONEOS || H || align=right data-sort-value="0.94" | 940 m || 
|-id=960 bgcolor=#fefefe
| 354960 ||  || — || April 18, 2006 || Kitt Peak || Spacewatch || — || align=right data-sort-value="0.99" | 990 m || 
|-id=961 bgcolor=#fefefe
| 354961 ||  || — || April 18, 2006 || Kitt Peak || Spacewatch || — || align=right data-sort-value="0.98" | 980 m || 
|-id=962 bgcolor=#fefefe
| 354962 ||  || — || April 18, 2006 || Kitt Peak || Spacewatch || NYS || align=right data-sort-value="0.80" | 800 m || 
|-id=963 bgcolor=#fefefe
| 354963 ||  || — || April 19, 2006 || Kitt Peak || Spacewatch || V || align=right data-sort-value="0.83" | 830 m || 
|-id=964 bgcolor=#fefefe
| 354964 ||  || — || April 19, 2006 || Kitt Peak || Spacewatch || V || align=right data-sort-value="0.88" | 880 m || 
|-id=965 bgcolor=#fefefe
| 354965 ||  || — || April 20, 2006 || Kitt Peak || Spacewatch || — || align=right data-sort-value="0.95" | 950 m || 
|-id=966 bgcolor=#fefefe
| 354966 ||  || — || April 20, 2006 || Anderson Mesa || LONEOS || — || align=right | 2.1 km || 
|-id=967 bgcolor=#fefefe
| 354967 ||  || — || April 25, 2006 || Kambah || Kambah Obs. || MAS || align=right data-sort-value="0.90" | 900 m || 
|-id=968 bgcolor=#fefefe
| 354968 ||  || — || April 19, 2006 || Mount Lemmon || Mount Lemmon Survey || — || align=right data-sort-value="0.83" | 830 m || 
|-id=969 bgcolor=#fefefe
| 354969 ||  || — || April 19, 2006 || Anderson Mesa || LONEOS || — || align=right data-sort-value="0.96" | 960 m || 
|-id=970 bgcolor=#fefefe
| 354970 ||  || — || April 19, 2006 || Catalina || CSS || — || align=right | 1.1 km || 
|-id=971 bgcolor=#fefefe
| 354971 ||  || — || April 24, 2006 || Kitt Peak || Spacewatch || MAS || align=right data-sort-value="0.72" | 720 m || 
|-id=972 bgcolor=#fefefe
| 354972 ||  || — || April 24, 2006 || Kitt Peak || Spacewatch || NYS || align=right data-sort-value="0.76" | 760 m || 
|-id=973 bgcolor=#fefefe
| 354973 ||  || — || September 22, 2004 || Kitt Peak || Spacewatch || — || align=right data-sort-value="0.93" | 930 m || 
|-id=974 bgcolor=#fefefe
| 354974 ||  || — || April 30, 2006 || Kitt Peak || Spacewatch || — || align=right data-sort-value="0.86" | 860 m || 
|-id=975 bgcolor=#d6d6d6
| 354975 ||  || — || April 26, 2006 || Kitt Peak || Spacewatch || SHU3:2 || align=right | 5.9 km || 
|-id=976 bgcolor=#fefefe
| 354976 ||  || — || April 30, 2006 || Kitt Peak || Spacewatch || NYS || align=right data-sort-value="0.76" | 760 m || 
|-id=977 bgcolor=#fefefe
| 354977 ||  || — || April 30, 2006 || Kitt Peak || Spacewatch || — || align=right data-sort-value="0.84" | 840 m || 
|-id=978 bgcolor=#fefefe
| 354978 ||  || — || April 24, 2006 || Socorro || LINEAR || NYS || align=right data-sort-value="0.76" | 760 m || 
|-id=979 bgcolor=#fefefe
| 354979 ||  || — || May 2, 2006 || Kitt Peak || Spacewatch || V || align=right data-sort-value="0.71" | 710 m || 
|-id=980 bgcolor=#d6d6d6
| 354980 ||  || — || May 5, 2006 || Kitt Peak || Spacewatch || 3:2 || align=right | 4.8 km || 
|-id=981 bgcolor=#fefefe
| 354981 ||  || — || May 19, 2006 || Catalina || CSS || NYS || align=right data-sort-value="0.83" | 830 m || 
|-id=982 bgcolor=#fefefe
| 354982 ||  || — || May 20, 2006 || Kitt Peak || Spacewatch || MAS || align=right data-sort-value="0.78" | 780 m || 
|-id=983 bgcolor=#fefefe
| 354983 ||  || — || May 20, 2006 || Kitt Peak || Spacewatch || MAS || align=right data-sort-value="0.90" | 900 m || 
|-id=984 bgcolor=#fefefe
| 354984 ||  || — || May 6, 2006 || Mount Lemmon || Mount Lemmon Survey || MAS || align=right data-sort-value="0.77" | 770 m || 
|-id=985 bgcolor=#fefefe
| 354985 ||  || — || May 20, 2006 || Kitt Peak || Spacewatch || NYS || align=right data-sort-value="0.70" | 700 m || 
|-id=986 bgcolor=#fefefe
| 354986 ||  || — || May 20, 2006 || Kitt Peak || Spacewatch || NYS || align=right data-sort-value="0.79" | 790 m || 
|-id=987 bgcolor=#fefefe
| 354987 ||  || — || May 21, 2006 || Mount Lemmon || Mount Lemmon Survey || MAS || align=right data-sort-value="0.88" | 880 m || 
|-id=988 bgcolor=#fefefe
| 354988 ||  || — || May 21, 2006 || Kitt Peak || Spacewatch || — || align=right | 1.0 km || 
|-id=989 bgcolor=#fefefe
| 354989 ||  || — || May 27, 2006 || Kitt Peak || Spacewatch || — || align=right | 1.0 km || 
|-id=990 bgcolor=#FA8072
| 354990 ||  || — || May 26, 2006 || Kitt Peak || Spacewatch || H || align=right data-sort-value="0.82" | 820 m || 
|-id=991 bgcolor=#E9E9E9
| 354991 ||  || — || June 23, 2006 || Palomar || NEAT || — || align=right | 1.8 km || 
|-id=992 bgcolor=#E9E9E9
| 354992 ||  || — || July 21, 2006 || Catalina || CSS || ADE || align=right | 2.6 km || 
|-id=993 bgcolor=#E9E9E9
| 354993 ||  || — || July 21, 2006 || Mount Lemmon || Mount Lemmon Survey || — || align=right | 1.6 km || 
|-id=994 bgcolor=#E9E9E9
| 354994 ||  || — || July 29, 2006 || Siding Spring || SSS || — || align=right | 2.3 km || 
|-id=995 bgcolor=#E9E9E9
| 354995 ||  || — || August 15, 2006 || Lulin Observatory || C.-S. Lin, Q.-z. Ye || — || align=right | 2.2 km || 
|-id=996 bgcolor=#E9E9E9
| 354996 ||  || — || August 13, 2006 || Palomar || NEAT || BRU || align=right | 3.5 km || 
|-id=997 bgcolor=#E9E9E9
| 354997 ||  || — || August 14, 2006 || Siding Spring || SSS || — || align=right | 2.4 km || 
|-id=998 bgcolor=#E9E9E9
| 354998 ||  || — || August 13, 2006 || Siding Spring || SSS || — || align=right | 2.3 km || 
|-id=999 bgcolor=#E9E9E9
| 354999 ||  || — || August 14, 2006 || Siding Spring || SSS || — || align=right | 2.6 km || 
|-id=000 bgcolor=#E9E9E9
| 355000 ||  || — || August 16, 2006 || Siding Spring || SSS || NEM || align=right | 2.9 km || 
|}

References

External links 
 Discovery Circumstances: Numbered Minor Planets (350001)–(355000) (IAU Minor Planet Center)

0354